This is a list of members of the Boston City Council, both past and present, serving the people of Boston, Massachusetts.

Council member selection

Since 1984, the council has consisted of 13 members; four members elected at-large and nine members elected by district. All 13 seats are contested every two years. The preliminary election and general election are held in September and November, respectively, of odd years with winners starting their terms in January of even years. For example; a preliminary election was held in September 2017 for the November 2017 general election, with elected council members starting their terms in January 2018.

Historically, the makeup of the council has changed multiple times. Since 1910:

Council members by year

1822–1829 

 1822 -  Aldermen:  Samuel Billings;  Ephraim Eliot;  Jacob Hall;  Joseph Head;  Joseph Jenkins;  Joseph Lovering;  Nathaniel Pope Russell;  Bryant Parrott Tilden. — Common Council:  William Barry;  Thaddeus Page;  Charles Wells;  Simon Wilkinson;  Martin Bates;  Benjamin Lamson;  Henry Orne;  Joseph Stodder;  Theodore Dexter;  Joshua Emmons;  Samuel Jones;  Joseph Coolidge;  Samuel Perkins;  Robert Gould Shaw;  Joel Thayer;  George Washington Coffin;  Thomas Kendall;  Horatio Gates Ware;  Isaac Winslow;  Samuel Appleton;  Thomas Motley;  Jesse Shaw;  William Sullivan;  Jonathan Amory;  Patrick Tracy Jackson;  Augustus Peabody;  Enoch Silsby;  Jonathan Davis;  Hawkes Lincoln;  William Prescott;  John Welles;  David Watts Bradlee; Peter Chardon Brooks;  James Perkins;  Benjamin Russell;  Andrew Drake;  Daniel Lewis Gibbens;  David Collson Moseley;  Isaac Stevens;  George Watson Brimmer;  Asa Bullard;  Barzillai Holmes;  Winslow Lewis;  Cyrus Alger;  John French;  John Howe;  Moses Williams.
 1823 -  Aldermen: Daniel Baxter;  George Odiorne;  David Weld Child;  Joseph Hawley Dorr; Asher Benjamin;  Enoch Patterson;  Caleb Eddy;  Stephen Hooper. — Common Council:  John Welles, President; John Elliot;  Joseph Wheeler;  John Parker Boyd;  John Richardson Adan;  John Damarisque Dyer;  Henry Farnam;  Elias Haskell;  John Sullivan Perkins;  Joseph Stacy Hastings;  Joel Prouty;  William Wright;  Samuel Swett;  Charles Pelham Curtis;  Lewis Tappan; James Savage;  Eliphalet Williams;  Samuel King Williams;  Aaron Baldwin;  David Francis;  Francis Johonnot Oliver;  Thomas Beale Wales;  Charles Howard;  Josiah Stedman;  Joseph Willet;  Samuel Bradlee;  Noah Brooks; Francis Jackson;  Charles Sprague.
 1824 -  Alderman:  Cyrus Alger. — Common Council:  Michael Tombs;  William Little Jr;  Oliver Reed;  Joseph Stone;  Edward Page;  William Sprague;  Jeremiah Fitch;  William Rounsville Pierce Washburn;  Eliphalet Porter Hartshorn;  George Washington Otis;  Winslow Wright;  Thomas Wiley;  William Goddard;  Elijah Morse;  Isaac Parker;  John Ballard;  John Chipman Gray;  Benjamin Willis;  Phineas Upham;  Samuel Frothingham;  Giles Lodge;  Isaac Thorn;  Charles Bemis.
 1825 -  Aldermen:  Daniel Carney;  John Bellows; Josiah Marshall;  John Damarisque Dyer;  Thomas Welsh Jr;  George Blake;  Henry Jackson Oliver;  John Bryant. — Common Council:  Robert Fennelly; Lewis Lerow;  Scammel Penniman;  Benjamin Clark;  John Fenno;  Thomas Wells;  Abraham William Fuller;  Amos Farnsworth;  George Hallet;  Ezra Dyer;  Charles Tracy;  William Simonds;  Isaac Waters;  Samuel Thaxter;  Franklin Dexter;  Jeremiah Smith Boies;  Levi Meriam;  Jeffrey Richardson;  Josiah Bradlee;  Jonathan Simonds;  John Parker Rice;  George Morey Jr;  Joshua Vose;  Adam Bent;  Oliver Fisher;  Ephraim Groves Ware.
 1826 - Aldermen:  John Foster Loring;  Francis Jackson;  Edward Hutchinson Robbins. — Common Council:  Lemuel Putnam Grosvenor;  Samuel Aspinwall;  Nathaniel Faxon;  Asa Adams;  William Howe;  John Warren James;  Joseph Eveleth;  Jonathan Thaxter;  William Parker;  Edward Brooks;  Charles Torrey;  Francis Bassett;  Joseph Helger Thayer;  Joseph Hawley Dorr;  John Baker;  Solomon Piper;  Charles Barnard;  Thomas Brewer;  Henry Hatch.
 1827 -  Aldermen:  Jeremiah Smith Boies;  Robert Fennelly;  Thomas Beale Wales; James Savage. — Common Council:  John Floyd Truman;  Thomas Gould;  Quincy Tufts;  Lewis Glover Pray;  George Lane;  Jonathan Loring;  Joseph Warren Lewis;  Samuel Dorr;  Samuel Dexter Ward; John Arno Bacon;  Thomas Walley Phillips;  Gamaliel Bradford;  John Prescott Bigelow;  Joshua Sears;  George Brinley;  William Parker;  Josiah Vose;  George Gay.
 1828 -  Aldermen:  Thomas Kendall;  James Hall;  Phineas Upham;  John Pickering;  Samuel Turell Armstrong. — Common Council: Ninian Clark Betton;  Horace Fox;  Eleazer Pratt;  Frederick Gould;  Henry Fowle Jr;  George Washington Johnson;  Levi Roberts Lincoln;  James Lendall Pitts Orrok;  Andrew Cunningham Jr;  James Means;  Ebenezer Appleton;  David Moody;  John Belknap; George Washington Adams;  Thomas Wren;  Waldo Flint;  Benjamin Toppan Pickman;  Norman Seaver;  Thomas Lamb;  Robert Treat Paine;  John Lowell Jr;  George Bethune;  Otis Everett;  Otis Turner;  Perez Gill;  Payson Perrin;  Alpheus Cary;  Walter Cornell; Joseph Neale Howe;  Benjamin Stevens.
 1829 -  Aldermen:  Benjamin Russell;  Winslow Lewis;  Charles Wells. — Common Council:  John Wells; Christopher Gore;  Henry Sewall Kent;  Samuel Ellis;  Thomas Reed;  Daniel Ballard;  Joseph Bradley;  Amos Bradley Parker;  John Rayner;  Samuel Davenport Torrey;  Samuel Austin Jr;  Jared Lincoln;  Samuel Goodhue;  Thomas Wetmore;  Walter Frost;  Isaac Danforth;  Jacob Aniee;  Levi Brigham;  Thomas Minns;  James Brackett Richardson;  Samuel Leonard Abbot;  Charles Casey Starbuck;  Aaron Willard Jr;  Isaac Parker Townsend.

1830–1839 

 1830 -  Aldermen:  John Burbeck McCleary;  Moses Williams. — Common Council:  Simon Wiggin Robinson;  Larra Crane;  Michael Lovell; Washington Parker Gragg;  Levi Haskell;  Charles Leighton; Joshua Seaver Jr;  Benjamin Parker;  Elias Hasket Derby;  Edward Goldsborough Prescott;  Joseph Reynolds Newell;  Leach Harris;  Levi Bliss;  Jabez Ellis;  Joseph Hay;  Thomas Melville Vinson;  James Wright.
 1831 -  Aldermen:  Henry Farnam;  Adam Bent;  John Binney;  Richard Devens Harris. — Common Council:  John Brigden Tremere;  Charles French;  Ephraim Milton;  Daniel Dickinson; James Clark;  Asa Swallow;  Samuel Chessman; Joshua Baker Flint;  Ensign Sargent;  Stephen Titcomb;  Levi Bartlett;  Abbott Lawrence;  Edward Hutchinson Robbins;  Ebenezer Bailey;  Josiah Pierce.
 1832 -  Aldermen:  Jabez Ellis;  James Bowdoin;  John Stevens;  William Tileston. — Common Council:  John Center;  Bill Richardson; Jonathan Porter;  Grenville Temple Winthrop; Henry Rice;  Richard Hildreth;  James Brown;  John Lewis Dimmock; Francis Brinley Jr;  John Collamore Jr;  John Lillie Phillips;  Gilman Prichard;  Henry Willis Kinsman;  Thomas Hunting;  Ebenezer Hayward;  Joseph Harris Jr.
 1833 -  Aldermen:  Thomas Wetmore;  Samuel Fales;  Joseph Warren Revere;  Benjamin Fiske. — Common Council:  Enoch Howes Snelling;  Thomas Hart Thompson;  Henry Andrews;  George Priest Thomas;  Philip Adams;  Edward Blake;  Henry Rice; Silas Pierce Tarbell;  Abel Phelps;  Perez Loring;  Luther Parks;  William Tappan Eustis;  Josiah Quincy Jr;  Oliver William Bourne Peabody;  Silas Bullard;  Francis Osborn Watts;  Abner Bourne;  Daniel Messinger;  Israel Martin;  Thomas Richards Dascomb;  John Doggett;  Samuel Gilbert Jr;  Ruel Baker;  James Blake;  Josiah Dunham.
  1834 -  Aldermen:  Charles Leighton;  Josiah Dunham;  Nathan Gurney;  Samuel Atkins Eliot;  Samuel Greele. — Common Council:  Henry D. Gray;  Robert Keith;  Henry Jackson Oliver;  George Washington Smith;  Henry Rice; Joseph Melcher Leavitt;  John Snelling;  Simon Green Shipley;  Ammi Cutter;  Ezra Trull;  Asa Lewis;  George Worthington Lewis;  Michael Roulstone;  Nathaniel Fellowes Cunningham;  Calvin Washburn;  Enoch Hobart;  George Washington Bazin;  Benjamin Apthorp Gould;  Isaac McLellan Jr;  Henry Sargent;  Edward Cruft Jr;  William Reed;  Elias Bond Thayer;  Philip Marett; Josiah Lee Currell Amee.
 1835 - Alderman: Joseph Henshaw Hay. — Common Council:  Isaac Harris;  Caleb Gould Loring;  Stephen William Olney;  Lewis Josselyn;  Thomas Hollis;  William Truman Spear;  Moses Grant;  George William Gordon;  Henry Lincoln;  Benajah Brigham;  Abraham Waters Blanchard; John C. Park; Jonathan Chapman;  Amos Wood;  Horatio Masa Willis;  Zebedee Cook Jr;  James Harris;  Horace Dupee;  Richard Sullivan Fay;  Jedediah Tuttle;  John Thompson;  William Bradlee Dorr;  John Green Jr;  John Bliss Stebbins.
 1836 -  Aldermen:  Thomas Hunting;  Samuel Quincy. — Common Council:  Joseph Bassett;  Gilbert Nurse;  William Eaton;  Thatcher Rich Raymond;  Nathan Carruth;  Thomas Moulton;  John Boles;  Benjamin Kimball;  Jason Dyer Battles;  Asa Barker Snow;  George Washington Edmands;  Ebenezer Ellis;  Henry Upham; Henry Edwards;  James Thomas Hobart;  Thomas Coffin Amory Wd;  William Greene Eaton;  Aaron Breed;  Elbridge Gerry Austin;  Benjamin Yeaton;  Benjamin Marshall Nevers;  Alpheus Stetson;  Stephen Child;  George Savage;  Solon Jenkins.
 1837 -  Aldermen:  John B. Wells;  Thomas Richardson. — Common Council:  Erasmus Thompson;  Thomas Hudson;  Samuel Lock Cutter;  William Orne Haskell;  Joseph Thornton Adams;  Edmund Trowbridge Hastings;  Philip Greely Jr.;  Francis Brown; Ezra Lincoln;  Thomas Buckminster Curtis;  Simon Davis Leavens;  Charles Brooks; Lemuel Shattuck;  Calvin Bullard;  Thomas Vose;  Josiah Dunham Jr;  John Thomas Dingley.
 1838 -  Aldermen:  Isaac Harris;  Martin Brimmer. — Common Council:  Benjamin Dodd;  Bradley Newcomb Cumings;  Rowland Ellis;  Charles Arnold;  James Morris Whiton;  Nathaniel Hammond;  James McAllaster;  Theophilus Burr;  Henry Rice; Newell Aldrich Thompson;  John Brooks Russell;  Benjamin Parker Richardson;  John Brooks Parker;  Thomas Jefferson Shelton Jonathan Preston Stephen Shelton;  Jeremy Drake;  Nehemiah Pitman Mann;  Samuel Wheeler;  Warren White.
 1839 - Alderman: James Harris. — Common Council:  Zebina Lee Raymond;  William Dillaway;  Richard Brackett;  Freeborn Fairfield Raymond;  Samuel Emmes;  Jacob Stearns;  Ezekiel Bates;  Charles Wilkins;  James Haughton;  Alfred Augustus Wellington;  William Vinal Kent;  Ephraim Larkin Snow;  Horace Williams;  Ezra Child Hutchins;  William Walker Parrott;  Gideon French Thayer;  Winslow Lewis Jr;  Elisha Copeland Jr; John Stevens;  Nicholas Noyes;  George Page;  Horatio Nelson Crane.

1840–1849 

 1840 -  Aldermen:  James Clark;  Charles Wilkins;  Abraham Thompson Lowe;  William Turell Andrews;  Charles Amory. — Common Council:  Henry Leeds;  William Russell Lovejoy;  Peter Dunbar;  Erastus Wilson Sanborn;  Dexter Follett;  Lucius Doolittle;  George Washington Otis Jr;  John Hubbard Wilkins;  Elijah Williams Jr;  George William Phillips;  Daniel Kimball;  Holmes Hinckley;  Eben Jackson.
 1841 -  Alderman: Benson Leavitt. — Common Council: Henry Northey Hooper;  Pelham Bonney;  Freeman Stowe;  Edward Parker Meriam;  Enoch Train;  Joseph Neale Howe Jr;  John Plummer Healy;  Theophilus Rogers Marvin;  Moses Whitney Jr;  Luther Blodgett;  John Gardner Nazro;  Richard Urann;  Edward Shirley Erving;  John Gray Roberts;  Samuel Leeds;  William Henry Howard;  Seriah Stevens;  William Burton Harding.
 1842 -  Aldermen:  Larra Crane;  William Parker,  Joseph Tilden;  James Longley;  Richard Urann. — Common Council:  Norton Newcomb;  Cyrus Buttrick;  Perkins Boynton;  Aaron Adams;  Joseph Cullen Ayer;  Abner Williams Pollard;  Enoch Hemenway Wakefield;  Francis Boardman Crowninshield;  William Brown Spooner;  Noah Sturtevant;  George Wheelwright;  Henry Plimpton;  Samuel Ripley Townsend;  William Augustus Weeks;  Josiah Moore Jones;  Benjamin Burchstead;  Charles Edward Cook;  John Rice Bradlee;  William Hayden;  Jonathan Ellis;  Henry Worthington Dutton;  William Dall;  Asaph Parmelee;  Robert Cowdin;  Willis Howes;  John Tillson;  Caleb Thurston.
 1843 -  Aldermen:  Simon Wilkinson;  Josiah Stedman;  Jonathan Preston. — Common Council:  Jacob George Lewis Libbey;  Daniel Bartlett Jr;  William Henry Learnard;  Joshua B. Fowle;  Henry Davis;  James Whiting;  James Harvey Dudley;  George Washington Crockett;  Willard Nason Fisher;  James Fowle;  Kimball Gibson;  Peleg Whitman Chandler;  John Slade Jr;  George Tyler Bigelow;  Andrew Townsend Hall;  Clement Willis;  Isaac Cary;  Greenleaf Connor Sanborn; Romanus Emerson.
 1844 -  Aldermen:  Simon Wiggin Robinson;  Henry Bromfield Rogers. — Common Council:  Job Turner;  John Plummer Ober;  Timothy Converse Kendall;  Oliver Dyer;  James Boynton;  Samuel Whitney Hall;  Charles Boardman;  Loring Norcross;  John Gardner;  Otis Clapp;  Benjamin Barnard Appleton;  Joseph Bradlee;  Samuel Topliff;  George Whittemore;  Samuel Harris;  Charles H. Brown;  William Pope;  Asa Brown;  Henry Wadsworth Fletcher;  Isaac Jones.
 1845 -  Aldermen:  William Pope;  John Hathaway;  Samuel Shurtleff Perkins;  Simon Green Shipley;  Joseph Cullen Ayer;  Lyman Reed;  James Sullivan Savage. — Common Council:  Samuel Parkman Oliver;  James Munroe;  William R. Carnes;  Benjamin Wood;  John Turner;  Artemus Ward;  Cyrus Cummings;  Samuel Abbott Lawrence;  Sargent Smith Littlehale;  Benjamin Seaver;  George R. Sampson;  George Stillman Hillard;  James Hayward;  Daniel Denny;  James Dennison;  George Davis;  Calvin Whiting Haven;  Samuel C. Demerest;  Thomas Jones;  Samuel Whittemore Sloan;  Theophilus Stover.
 1846 -  Aldermen:  Frederick Gould;  Charles Allyn Wells;  Thomas Jones;  George Edward Head. — Common Council:  Samuel C. Nottage;  Noah Harrod;  George Carlisle;  George Cofran;  Jeremiah Ross;  Thomas Butler Pope;  Thomas Haviland;  Charles Henry Parker;  Nathaniel Wheeler Coffin;  William Whitney;  Walter Bryent;  Henry Waldo Cushing;  James Dodd;  John L. Emmons;  Stephen Tucker;  George Washington Frothingham; William Eaton;  Seth Adams;  John W. Crafts.
 1847 -  Aldermen:  John Hubbard Wilkins;  Billings Briggs. — Common Council:  Noah Lincoln Jr;  William Wildes;  Edwin Curtis Bailey;  George W. Felt;  William Whitwell Greenough;  Darwin Erasmus Jewett;  Eliphalet Jones;  William Dawes Coolidge;  George Whiting Abbot;  Richard Bridge Carter;  William Gray Brooks;  Samuel Eliot Guild;  Francis Gardner;  Willard Adams Harrington;  William Blake;  Tisdale Drake;  Samuel Wales Jr;  Ezra Lincoln Jr;  Jabez Coney;  Samuel Shurtleff Perkins;  Alvan Simonds.
 1848 - Aldermen:  John Plummer Ober;  Moses Grant. — Common Council:  John Hillard Bowker;  Abel B. Munroe;  William Palfrey;  George D. Boardman Blanchard;  Thomas Critchet;  John Phelps Putnam;  Josiah Putnam Bradlee;  Nathaniel Brewer;  Solomon Hopkins;  Jesse Maynard;  Benjamin James;  Joseph Smith.
 1849 - Alderman: Samuel Hall. — Common Council:  Isaiah Faxon;  William Parkman;  Emory Goss;  Julius Auboineau Palmer;  Robert Marsh;  John Atkins;  Nathaniel Seaver;  Frederick Crosby;  Benjamin Beal;  John M. Wright;  Charles Brown;  Edward Hennessey;  Daniel Noyes Haskell;  Richard B. Callender;  Calvin Whiting Clark;  George Woodman;  Moses Kimball;  Reuben Lovejoy;  Manlius Stimson Clarke;  George William McLellan;  Albert T. Minot;  Francis Richards;  Samuel Dexter Crane.

1850–1859 

 1850 - Aldermen:  Solomon Piper;  Henry Manning Holbrook;  James Perkins. — Common Council:  John Cushing;  Solomon Carter;  Charles Emerson;  Henry Joseph Gardner;  William C. Ford;  Abraham Gibson Wyman;  Avery Plumer Jr;  Ebenezer Dale;  Samuel Appleton Appleton;  David Chapin;  John B. Dexter Jr;  James W. Sever;  Joseph W. Merriam;  Aaron Heywood Bean.
 1851 -  Aldermen:  Abel B. Munroe;  Calvin Whiting Clark;  Moses Kimball;  Benjamin Smith. — Common Council:  James G. Hovey;  Joel M. Holden;  Charles H. Stearns;  Cyrus Washburn;  James B. Allen;  William Howard Calrow;  Richard Shackford;  Hiram Bosworth;  Thomas Sprague;  Andrew Abbot;  James Lawrence;  Harvey Jewell;  Ezekiel Kendall;  Oliver B. Dorrance;  Francis C. Manning;  Peter C. Jones;  Otis Kimball;  Edward Reed;  Andrew J. Loud;  Theodore P. Hale;  Zibeon Southard.
 1852 -  Aldermen:  Benjamin James; Sampson Reed;  Jacob Sleeper;  Lyman Perry;  Benjamin Leach Allen;  Thomas Phillips Rich;  Isaac Cary. — Common Council:  Elijah Stearns;  Benjamin Fessenden;  Edward A. Vose;  George Wilson;  Andrew Burnham;  Samuel A. Bradbury;  Dexter Roby;  John James Rayner;  Joseph D. Roberts;  Paul Adams;  William Thomas;  Frederick H. Stimpson;  Samuel Nicolson;  Edward H. Eldredge;  Farnham Plummer;  Amos Cutler;  George Washington Warren;  John Odin Jr;  John F. Banister;  Horace A. Breed;  Aaron Hobart;  David Hamblen;  John Proctor;  George N. Noyes;  Samuel Rogers Spinney.
 1853 - Aldermen:  James Whiting;  Benjamin Franklin White;  Oliver Frost. — Common Council:  Charles Todd Woodman;  Charles A. Turner;  Henry D. Gardiner;  Daniel Dole Kelly;  Benjamin F. Russell;  Mical Tubbs;  Charles Dupee;  William F. Goodwin;  Martin L. Hall;  Israel C. Rice;  Matthew Binney;  Ezra Forristall;  Francis B. Winter;  Henry Fowle Durant; William Washburn;  Samuel Hatch;  William Burrage;  Charles Demond;  John H. Thorndike;  Calvin P. Hinds;  Thacher Beal;  Joseph Lawrence Drew;  Jonas Harrod French;  Samuel J. M. Homer;  Joel Richards; Alexander Hamilton Rice;  Stephen Tilton Jr;  Gardner P. Drury;  John A. Cummings;  Charles C. Conley;  Joshua Jenkins;  William S. Thacher;  James F. Whittemore.
 1854 -  Aldermen:  John Thomas Dingley;  Josiah Dunham Jr;  William Washburn;  Tisdale Drake;  George Frederick Williams;  George Odiorne. — Common Council:  William P. Howard;  John Davis;  Morrill Cole;  Watson G. Mayo;  Ebenezer Atkins;  Caleb S. Johnson;  Benjamin F. Mahan;  George Washington Messinger;  John M. Clark;  George W. Chipman;  Levi Boles;  Daniel Warren;  George S. Jones;  Jonathan Amory Davis;  Hiram Simmons;  Ebenezer Johnson;  Artemas Stone;  David Whiton;  Charles Owen Rogers;  John W. T. Stodder;  David Bryant;  Hezekiah Prince;  John R. Mullin;  John W. F. Hobbs;  Charles Mayo;  Edward H. Brainard.
 1855 -  Aldermen:  Robert Cowdin;  Samuel Topliff;  Thomas Sprague;  Joseph Lawrence Drew;  Charles Todd Woodman;  John M. Clark;  Salma Elger Gould;  Charles Woodberry;  Albion Keith Parris Joy;  Benjamin Franklin Cooke;  Goorge Washington Messinger. — Common Council:  William Marble;  Samuel P. Whitman;  George Dexter Ricker;  Bradbury G. Prescott;  Austin Gove;  Amos A. Dunnels;  Edward Francis Porter;  Samuel Jepson;  Jonathan B. Severance;  William H. Lounsbury;  Edward W. Hinks;  Robert I. Burbank;  Charles B. Farley;  Lorenzo S. Cragin;  Jerome W. Tyler;  Joseph Story;  Joseph A. Pond;  William Giles Harris;  George W. Learnard;  Benjamin Franklin Stevens;  Alvin Vinal;  Hales Wallace Suter;  Joseph Buckley;  Sylvester P. Gilbert;  Frederick L. Washburn;  Charles Nowell;  William B. Merrill;  William Augustus Bell;  Samuel W. Ropes;  Charles S. Burgess;  Eben Tarbell;  Jairus A. Frost;  George S. Dexter;  Daniel Hall;  Jedediah P. Bean.

 1856 -  Aldermen:  Eben Jackson;  Pelham Bonney;  Timothy Converse Kendall;  William Howard Calrow;  Farnham Plummer;  James Cheever;  Osmyn Brewster;  Levi Benjamin Meriam;  Otis Rich;  George Washington Torrey;  Robert Codman;  Joseph Milner Wightman. — Common Council:  Oliver Frost;  William A. Kruger;  Henry A. Dalton;  William S. Albertson;  James M. Stevens;  Lucius A. Bigelow;  James W. Russell;  John Peak;  Jacob Albert Dresser; Oliver Stevens; Reuben Reed;  Barnet F. Warner;  Daniel J. Coburn;  Ezra Farnsworth;  John G. Webster;  Davis B. Roberts;  Rufus B. Bradford;  Daniel Cragin;  David F. McGilvray;  Nahum Morrill Morrison;  Lemuel Miles Standish;  Robert Slade;  Nathaniel Cushing Nash;  Francis Jewett Parker;  William Fox Richardson;  Frederick Fessenden Thayer;  Julian Ovando Mason;  Ezra Harlow;  Freeman Marshall Josselyn Jr;  Lewis Gary Whiton;  Sumner Crosby.
 1857 -  Aldermen:  Solomon Carter;  Samuel Hatch; Silas Peirce;  James Nute;  Timothy Allen Sumner. — Common Council:  John B. Wedger;  Nehemiah Gibson;  Benjamin F. Palmer;  Benjamin Pond;  James J. Cobb;  Samuel Talbot Jr;  Francis Edwin Faxon;  George N. Nichols;  George Atwood Shaw 6;  John Stanhope Damrell;  George W. Tuxbury;  John H. Barry;  Henry E. Bayley;  George Silsbee Hale;  James H. Beal;  Benjamin French;  Sidney Algernon Stetson;  John Tyler;  Josiah B. Richardson;  Samuel Wallis Waldron Jr;  Davis W. Bailey;  Henry Mason.
 1858 -  Aldermen:  Samuel Dexter Crane;  Charles Emerson;  Rufus B. Bradford;  George Dennie;  George Augustus Curtis;  Jesse Holbrook;  Ebenezer Atkins. — Common Council:  John W. Bartlett;  Albert Betteley;  Horace Poland;  John C. Tucker;  Francis Dana Stedman;  Alexander Wadsworth;  William Cross Williamson;  Joseph L. Bates;  Jairus Beal;  Lucius Slade;  Joseph Lyman Henshaw;  Prescott Barker;  Henry Williamson Haynes;  Elijah Drew;  Timothy R. Page; Thomas M. Howard;  Edward F. Robinson;  John A. Warren;  Edward F. Hall;  William S. McGowan;  Calvin Allen Richards; Benjamin B.  Brown;  George P. French;  Henry B. Janes;  Chauncy Page.
 1859 -  Aldermen:  Clement Willis;  William Welden Allen;  Joseph Tilden Bailey;  Thomas Coffin Amory Jr;  Otis Clapp. — Common Council:  Samuel Brown Krogman;  Cornelius Doherty;  Gilbert E. Pierce;  Joseph Robbins;  William Clark Burgess; Thomas Mooney;  Theophilus Burr Jr;  John H. Robinson;  Philip Howes Sears;  Jabez Frederick;  Gharles J. McCarthy;  James Riley;  John Steele Tyler;  Jonas Fitch;  John Langdon Batchelder;  William Carpenter;  Horace Jenkins;  Levi Lincoln Willcutt;  Justin Jones;  Ansel Lothrop;  William Warland Clapp Jr;  Joseph Frost Paul;  Osborn Howes;  Joel Baker Jr.

1860–1869 

 1860 -  Aldermen:  Francis Edwin Faxon;  Harrison Otis Briggs;  James Laighton Hanson. — Common Council:  John Dacey;  Thomas A. Mathews;  Albert P. Morrison;  Daniel Goodwin;  George Thomas Sampson;  John Allison;  John Milton Roberts;  William Edward Webster;  Lyman Sawin Hapgood;  Nathaniel C. A. Preble;  Benjamin Greenleaf Boardman;  Gardiner Howland Shaw;  John Leahy;  Joseph Hildreth Bradley;  Samuel A. B. Bragg; George Partridge Sanger;  William Bentley Fowle Jr; Joseph W. Howard;  Henry Souther;  George Washington Sprague;  Benjamin Pope.
 1861 -  Aldermen:  Samuel Rogers Spinney;  Nehemiah Gibson;  George Washington Parmenter;  Moses Clark;  John Francis Pray;  Elisha Tyson Wilson. — Common Council:  Andrew Ainsworth;  John William Leighton;  Cornelius Murphy;  Horace Dodd;  Albert Bowker;  Stephen N. Stockwell;  Sylvanus Allen Denio;  John Rogers;  Philip O. Donnell;  Seldon Crockett;  Elias E. Davison;  Benjamin Franklin Edmands;  Daniel H. Whitney;  Daniel Carr Jr;  John S. Pear;  Daniel Davies;  Henry W. Foley;  Morris C. Fitch;  Frederick Grant;  John Coffin Jones Brown;  William A. Clark;  Francis H. Ward;  John Borrowscale;  Joseph F. Huntress;  Joshua Dorsey Ball;  John C. Fallon;  Hollis Randall Gray.
 1862 -  Aldermen:  Francis Richards No;  Joseph Lyman Henshaw;  Joseph Frost Paul;  Calvin Allen Richards;  Otis Norcross. — Common Council:  Dennis Bonner;  Matthew Keany;  Richard Beeching;  George Hinman;  Augustus Reed;  Bernard Cullen;  John Glancy;  Joseph Andrew Brown;  Linus Mason Child;  Michael F. Wells;  William Emery Bicknell;  George P. Clapp;  George Otis Shattuck;  Edward Ryan;  Windsor Hatch; Franklin H. Sprague;  Samuel G. Bowdlear;  William Hormby Ireland;  Loring B. Barnes;  Cyrus Hicks;  Horace Bullard Fisher;  Lucius A. Cutler;  Henry A. Drake;  Stanley Gore.
 1863 -  Aldermen:  Sylvanus Allen Denio;  Robert Marsh;  Lemuel Miles Standish;  John Steele Tyler;  Hiram Ambrose Stevens. — Common Council:  Patrick McLaughlin;  Charles Rankin McLean;  Nicholas J. Bean;  John Minot Fiske;  Granville Mears;  William Wilkins Warren;  Joseph Allen;  Joseph Richardson;  David Hill Coolidge;  Charles Woodbury; John P. Ordway;  Daniel J. Sweeney; John Tisdale Bradlee;  Gilbert C. Brown;  John C. Haynes;  Patrick F. Logan;  Nathaniel Adams;  William Cumston;  Nathan Morse;  William Gallagher;  Lewis J. Bird.
 1864 -  Aldermen:  George Washington Warren;  Nathaniel Cushing Nash;  William Warland Clapp Jr;  George Washington Sprague;  Daniel Davies;  Charles Francis Dana. — Common Council:  Jabez Fisher Hewes;  Albert Stevens Pratt;  John Turner;  William W.  Elliott;  Nathaniel McKay;  Edwin Mason Putnam;  Lewis Rice;  Patrick H. Farren;  Robert Bunten;  Thomas Gaffield;  Patrick Tracy Jackson;  William Mooney;  Samuel Harvey Loring;  Thomas Francis Richardson;  Joshua Putnam Preston;  Cadis Barney Boyce;  Solomon B. Stebbins;  George Parmer Darrow;  Moses Wright Richardson;  Charles W. Livermore;  Thomas Gogin;  Horace Smith;  Moses Colman.
 1865 -  Aldermen:  Edward Francis Porter;  Thomas Gaffield. — Common Council:  John Miller;  Andrew Hall;  Allen Riley;  John F. Flynn;  Joel Gray;  Noah Webster Farley;  Augustine G. Stimson;  Weston Lewis;  Jarvis Dwight Braman;  Francis Winthrop Palfrey;  James Joseph Flynn;  William Driver Park;  Walbridge Abner Field;  Horace Leander Bowker;  Job T. Souther;  Benjamin Dean;  Freeborn Adams Jr.
 1866 -  Aldermen:  Jonas Fitch;  Charles Wesley Slack;  Gilbert Wait;  Noah Mayo Jr. — Common Council:  William James Ellis;  Francis James Munroe;  Moses B. Tower;  Dennis Cawley Jr;  Murdock Matheson;  Elam W. Hale;  Increase Eldredge Noyes;  Alfonso Bowman;  Christopher Augustus Connor;  Thomas Leavitt;  Hugh Ambrose Madden;  Michael Carney;  Israel Smith Trafton;  Edward Augustus White;  William Sanford Hills;  George Nowell;  Jeremiah L. Newton;  Daniel Gorton Grafton;  Samuel W. Hodges;  Charles Caverly Jr;  Matthias Rich;  Jonas Ball;  Hubbard Winslow Tilton;  Henry Dwight Hyde;  Solomon S. Gray;  Henry E. Bradlee.

 1867 - Aldermen:  William Cumston;  Charles Rankin McLean;  Albert Stevens Pratt;  Jarvis Dwight Braman;  Edward Augustus White;  Walter Edward Hawes;  Newton Talbot. — Common Council:  William Woolley;  George E. Young;  Michael Carney;  John Furness Jarvis;  Edward R. Merritt;  Charles R. Train;  Edward E. Batchelder;  Francis Augustus Osborn;  Hiram Burr Crandall;  Oliver Cromwell Livermore;  William H. Emerson;  Warren Lothrop Tower;  Henry Clement Lougee;  George Baxter Jr;  Sewall B. Bond;  Lucius W. Knight;  William R. Bryden;  Frederick A. Wilkins;  Albert F. Upton;  Charles Hastings Allen;  Ivory Bean;  Henry Warren Wilson;  Howard A. Doe.
 1868 -  Aldermen:  Nathaniel Seaver; Samuel Crocker Cobb;  Moses Fairbanks. — Common Council:  James Byron Nason;  Joshua Weston;  Thomas Dinsmore;  Edward Malone;  Thomas Leighton Jenks;  Lyman Alonzo Belknap;  Zimri B. Heywood;  Michael J. Driscoll;  William M. Flanders;  Francis Wayland Jacobs  -;  Sereno T. Thayer;  Horace Goodman Tucker;  Robert Bishop;  Michael G. Minon;  John White;  Sidney Squires;  Samuel Rice;  Ebenezer Nelson;  Charles S. Butler;  George P. Denny;  Horace Tyler Rockwell;  Samuel B. Hopkins;  Samuel Thomas Snow;  Albert Judd Wright;  William Treadwell Van Nostrand;  Thomas Dolan;  Benjamin Franklin;  Lemuel Foster Morse;  Joseph T. Ryan;  William Hobbs Jr;  Augustus Parker;  Henry B. Phelps;  Henry White Pickering;  James Monroe Keith;  Everett C. Kingsbury;  John Austin Rogers;  Horace H. White.
 1869 -  Aldermen:  Lewis Rice;  John Tisdale Bradlee;  William Treadwell Van Nostrand;  George Partridge Baldwin. — Common Council:  Jeremiah Hobbs Pote;  Thomas Doherty;  George Going;  Nathan Hagar Daniels;  Amos Lucian Noyes;  Milford Joy Coyle;  Grenville Temple Winthrop Braman;  Albert Frye Cole;  Winslow Bradford Lucas;  James K. Crowley;  Edmund B. Vannevar;  William Frost;  Albert Gay;  George Edward Learned;  John Osborne Poor;  George H. Johnston;  Solomon Adams Woods;  Melville Ezra Ingalls;  Jeremiah M. Mullane;  George C. Pearson;  David P. Davis; Gurdon C. Judson;  Giles Hopkins Rich;  Nathan D. Conant.

1870–1879 

 1870 -  Aldermen:  Christopher Augustus Connor; Francis Wayland Jacobs;  Grenville Temple Winthrop Braman;  George Washington Pope;  Charles Edwin Jenkins;  George Oliver Carpenter;  Henry Lillie Pierce. — Common Council:  Joseph H. Barnes;  William Francis Brooks;  Thomas W. Brown Jr;  William Taylor;  Albert Cushman Pond;  Eugene C. Donnelly;  Charles Brooks Perkins;  Barney Hull;  John Joseph Murphy;  John Quinn;  Stephen Rensselaer Niles;  George Middleton Barnard Jr;  John O. Brien;  John Henry Giblin;  Patrick O. Connor;  Isaac Hale Robbins;  John Sam Moulton;  Calvin M. Winch;  Solomon Sewall Rowe;  William Jamieson Smith;  Daniel Augustus Patch;  William C. Roberts;  John Bullard Meads;  William Morse;  Franklin Williams;  Joel Seaverns;  Adams Ayer;  Herman D. Bradt;  James Devine;  Patrick Henry Rogers;  Charles D. Bickford;  William Pope;  William Say;  Thomas French Temple; George Lathe Burt.
 1871 - Aldermen:  Avery Plumer;  George Dexter Ricker;  Samuel Talbot Jr;  William Woolley;  Samuel Little; Leonard Richardson Cutter. — Common Council:  James Smith;  Frederick Pease;  William Cunningham;  George S. Kendall;  Thomas R. Jacobs;  Stephen Decatur Salmon Jr;  Alfred Alonzo Clatur;  John Robertson;  John W. Foye;  Henry Nathan Stone;  William Edward Perkins;  David Locke Webster;  Robert McDevitt;  Edward J. Long;  Washington L. Prescott;  James Davis Knowles Willis;  Stephen Locke Emery;  Wallace Fullam Robinson;  Marquis Fayette Dickinson Jr;  Charles Henry Hersey;  John Henry Locke;  Thomas Brennan;  Theodore C. Faxon;  Isaac Paul Gregg;  Alfred Heyer Perry;  William Henry West.
 1872 -  Aldermen: Thomas Leighton Jenks;  Sidney Squires;  William Say;  Stephen Abbot Stackpole;  John Taylor Clark;  William Chadwell Poland;  James Power. — Common Council:  Neil Doherty;  Patrick Collins;  Timothy J. Dacey;  Thomas J. Anderson;  George Parkman Kingsley;  Horace E. Walker;  Edward Olcott Shepard;  Horace Loring;  Francis Michael Hughes;  Edward J. Holmes;  John Bernard Martin;  John Edward Fitzgerald;  Abraham John Lamb;  Charles Darrow;  Benjamin Heath;  David Whiston;  Cyrus Andrew Page;  Edward Payson Wilbur;  James Freeman Marston;  John Johnson McNutt;  Frederick Samuel Risteen;  Wilmon Whilldin Blackmar;  Asa Harden Caton;  William Henry Hart;  Daniel Dowd;  Bartholomew Dolan;  William Hatch Jones;  William G. Thacher;  Hiram Augustus Wright;  Charles Augustus Burditt;  Hartford Davenport.
 1873 -  Aldermen:  Solomon B. Stebbins;  John Brown;  Alanson Bigelow;  Hiram Emery;  Charles Hulbert;  Samuel Miller Quincy. — Common Council:  William McKenney;  Thomas H. Doherty;  Jacob Abbott;  Charles Edward Powers;  Michael James Flatley;  John W. Mahan;  Robert McCue;  Elijah B.  Hine;  John Madden;  Henry W. Harrington;  Edwin Hutton Woods;  John Quincy Adams Brackett;  Andrew Jackson Hall;  Samuel S. Cudworth;  Hillman B. Barnes;  Harrison Loring;  Hiram A. Bowles;  Alonzo Warren;  William G. Train;  William Elliot Woodward;  Charles G. Davis;  Ebenezer Adams;  Halsey Joseph Boardman;  Pierpont Edwards;  Frederick Bleiler;  Michael Kelley;  James Humphreys Upham.
 1874 -  Aldermen:  William Francis Brooks;  Andrew Jackson Hall;  Charles Jones Prescott;  Thomas Burdett Harris;  Francis Alonzo Peters;  Roland Worthington. — Common Council:  Frederick B. Day;  Rufus Cushman;  Michael D. Collins;  James Bent;  Thomas Mooney;  George F. Gordon;  Thomas Charles Butler;  Henry Harrison Sprague;  Michael H. McCarty;  Richard Jennings;  David Pulsifer Kimball;  Samuel H. Russell;  Uriel Haskell Crocker;  Edward William Barry;  Frank B. Brown;  Francis H. Peabody;  John Sweetser;  Zenas E. Smith;  Henry Lowell Leach;  John Goldthwait;  Horace M. Bearce;  Frederick Griswold Walbridge;  Nathan S. Wilbur;  Thacher F. Sweat;  Henry Ware Putnam;  Henry W. Fuller;  Samuel Cony Perkiris;  Alexander Beal;  William Minot Jr;  Francis Hunnewell;  Patrick Moley;  Edwin Sibley; James F. Dacey;  William H. Kent;  Francis William Pray;  George H. Long;  John Tyler Hicks.
 1875 -  Aldermen:  William Pope;  Abraham Orlando Bigelow;  Alvah Augustus Burrage;  Clinton Viles;  Hugh O'Brien; — Common Council:  Emery Dyer Leighton;  Jeremiah Harrigan; Charles Marvel Kingsley;  Jeremiah A. Murray;  Albus R. Cushing; William Henry Whitmore;  Alexander Fairfield Wadsworth;  John H. Walsh;  John Augustus Duggan;  Ward;  Curtis Guild;  Walter Harmon;  Patrick Barry;  Thomas J. Fitzpatrick;  John Osborne Jr;  Francis Jaques;  Eugene Henry Sampson;  Joseph Augustus Felt;  Otis H. Pierce;  Osborne Howes Jr;  George Leonard Damon;  James A. Lappen;  Ephraim D. Whitcomb;  George J. Coyle;  Lowell Brigham Hiscock;  John F. Newton;  Isaac P. Clarke;  Omar Loring;  Charles F. Curtis;   Charles E. Rice;  Ezra Jackson Trull;  Benjamin Franklin Stacey;  John Kelley;  John N. Devereux;  Richard Power.
 1876 -  Aldermen:  George Thomas Sampson;  Liverus Hull;  Francis Thompson;  Choate Burnham;  Thomas Jones Whidden. — Common Council:  Edwin R. Webster;  Edward Pearl;  William J. Burke;  Albert H. Taylor;  Marcellus Day;  Phinehas J. Stone Jr;  Stephen G. Jones;  Franklin Oliver Reed;  George F. Shepard;  Sidney E. Adams;  Michael Barr;  John William Fraser;  Daniel Doherty;  Joseph Doherty;  James O. Donnell;  Warren Kendall Blodgett;  James Hall Jr; George Lewis Ruffin;  John A. Smardon;  Alfred Israel Woodbury;  James W. Fox;  John Mullen;  Martin Luther Ham;  Richard Pope;  Francis Allen Davis;  Abraham Firth;  William Tuttle;  William Everett Shay;  Christopher J. Spenceley;  James Benton Graham;  Joseph Morrill Jr;  William Blanchard;  Benjamin Holt Ticknor; John Wilder May;  James Homer Pierce.
 1877 -  Aldermen:  Lucius Slade;  John Edward Fitzgerald;  Charles Henry Bass Breck;  George Dunbar;  Richard Worth Robinson;  Charles Woodard Wilder. — Common Council:  James J. Doherty;  George Larkin Thorndike;  George B. Webster;  Peter Stillings Roberts;  Frederick B. Day;  Norman Young Brintnall;  John H. Dee;  John Kelley;  John Augustine Kidney;  Richard Roach;  Peter Cannon;  Edward O. Donnell;  Patrick F. McGaragle;  Thomas O. Connor;  Robert Means Thompson;  James Bailey Richardson;  James Hutchins Danforth;  Oscar Brownell Mowry;  Roger Wolcott;  Jeremiah Henry Mullane;  Patrick Francis McDonald;  James F. McClusky;  James W. Loughlin;  Joaquin Kilvert Souther;  Oliver George Fernald;  Robert Cox;  John Cross;  Andrew Jackson;  Dennis Ambrose Flynn;  Salmon P. Hibbard;  Charles Henry Reed;  James Henry Nugent;  James Fagan;  Charles Edward Pratt;  James Joseph Barry;  Henry Francis Coe;  Alfred Staniford Brown;  Charles S. Perham;  Coolidge Barnard;  Robert Vose Jr;  Webster F. Warren.
 1878 -  Aldermen:  Lewis Cary Whiton;  Samuel Cony Perkins;  Curtis Guild;  George Burrell Faunce;  Charles Hayden,;  Josiah Shepard Robinson;  John Perrin Spaulding. — Common Council:  James Woolley;  Harvey Newton Shepard;  Benjamin Brintnall;  Nathaniel D. Toppan;  George H. Lovering;  Charles W. Howland;  John Drynan;  Alexander B. McGahey;  Dennis O. Connor;  Lemuel Meader Ham; John J. Smith;  Nathaniel Johnson Rust;  Charles Wheeler;  Thomas Joseph Denney;  Thomas Henry Devlin;  James Aloysius McGeough;  Howard Clapp;  Thomas Hill;  Albert Frederic Lauten;  John Tavlor;  Isaac Rosnosky;  Jesse Leonard Nason;  John Freeman Colby;  Oscar Hallett Sampson;  Nathan Sawyer;  John P. Santry;  John Patrick Brawley;  Paul Henry Kendricken;  William E. Whitcher;  Thomas Edwin Wilson;  George H. Wyman;  Francis J;  Charles Herbert Plimpton;  Henry Nathan Sawyer;  George Warren Hollis;  Jacob F. Taylor.
 1879 - Aldermen:  Daniel Dole Kelly;  Benjamin Pope;  James Joseph Flynn;  Joseph Augustus Tucker;  George Edwin Bell. — Common Council:  Martin Moore Hancock;  Cornelius Francis Doherty;  John Thomas Hayes;  Frank Eliot Sweetser;   William Hanson Howard;  Otis B. Dudley;  John Paul Hilton;  Andrew A. O'Dowd;  Stephen F. McLaughlin;  Roger John Kelley;  John Doherty;  Charles V. Bunten;  James Christal;  Henry Parkman;  Malcolm Scollay Greenough;  Henry Walton Swift;  Joseph Healy;  Charles F. Austin;  Nicholas Furlong;  Francis O. Brien;  John Cannon;  George Henry Cavanagh;  Evan H. Morgan;  John Elliott Bowker;  George T. Perkins;  John William Morrison;  Thomas Norton Hart;  Benjamin Franklin Anthony;  Patrick James Maguire;  John Andrew Slattery;  Timothy A. Murphy;  Michael William Costello;  John Eli Blakemore;  Albert Thomas Stearns;  George Albert Fisher;  John A. Sawyer.

1880–1889 

 1880 -  Aldermen:  Asa Harden Caton;  Frederick Griswold Walbridge;  George Larkin Thorndike;  Charles Varney Whitten;  Joseph Caldwell. — Common Council:  Clarence Parker Lovell;  Daniel J. Sweeney;  Hiram I. Nason;  Matthew Walsh;  Andrew Jackson Bailey;  Philip J. McLaughlin;  Edward Dixon;  John Patrick Joseph;  William Joseph Welch;  John Bernard Fitzpatrick;  Alden Everett Viles;  James Goldthwaite Freeman Alder;  man;  Eugene Bigelow Hagar;  William Fisher Wharton;  Charles Herbert Williams;  Patrick H. Cronin;  Martin Thomas Folan;  John I. Lane;  Lewis Raymond Tucker;  Charles William Donahoe;  Frank Foster Farwell;  Henry Elisha Hosley;  David Franklin Barry;  Dudley Richards Child;  Nathaniel Brimbecom;  Jeremiah J. McNamara;  Abraham Theobald Rogers;  Horace Beals Clapp;  Austin Bigelow.
 1881 -  Aldermen:  Charles Henry Hersey;  George Curtis;  Cyrus Summerfield Haldeman;  William Frost. — Common Council:  Peter Morrison;  Jesse Morse Gove,;  Christopher Patrick Conlin;  Charles Francis Quigley;  William L. Harding;  Francis J. Murphy;  Henry Ward Beecher Cotton;  Samuel Josiah Harrison;  George Frederick Mullett;  James F. Daly;  Martin Sumner McCormick;  John Aloysius McLaughlin;  John Joseph Foyle;  James W. Pope;  Prentiss Cummings;  George Lewis Huntress;  Charles A. Powers;  Joseph Binard Gomez;  Otis Dexter Dana;  William Eustis Bartlett;  Leander Beal;  William H. Ford;  Thomas Jefferson Emery;  James Teevan;  William Caverly Fisk;  Arthur Frederick Means;  Joseph Patrick Connell;  Nathan Gilman Smith;  Thomas Richard Mathews;  Nelson Sumner Wakefield;  Reuben Samuel Swan;  Otis Eddy.
 1882 -  Aldermen:  Benjamin Franklin Anthony;  Thomas Norton Hart;  Laban Pratt;  Clinton White. — Common Council:  Benjamin P. Bates;  James Edmund Fitzgerald;  Alfred N. Proctor;  Ernest Clifton Marshall;  Horace E. Boynton;  Patrick John Donovan;  Michael J. Houghton;  Daniel McLaughlin;  John Joseph Cannon;  Godfrey Morse;  Edward Perry Fisk;  John Davis Williams French;  James Henry Stack;  James Ambrose Murphy;  William Henry Frizzell;  Charles H. Orr;  James Donovan;  Frederick Bourne Taylor;  John Good;  Felix Aloysius Strange;  Michael J. Killion;  Charles Henry Wise;  Munroe Chickering;  Joseph Francis Howland;  John Henry Lee.
 1883 -  Aldermen:  Francis William Pray;  Thomas Henry Devlin;  Paul Henry Kendricken;  William Joseph Welch;  Edwin Forrest Leighton. — Common Council:  Edwin Grosvenor Smith;  Walter F. Burk;  William Abraham Foss;  George E. Bacon;  Joseph W. Peterson;  Samuel Lombard;  Harvey Newton Collison;  James H. Gallagher;  Robert Donnelly;  Francis Patrick Maguire;  Andreas Blume;  Eugene David Sullivan; Patrick Leo Cassidy;  George Francis Henry Murray;  Benjamin W. Dean;  Charles Michael Bromwich;  George Henry Bond;  John Edward Lappen;  James F. Marley;  Aaron Francis Richards;  Samuel Hichborn;  Francis L. White;  William A. Thomes;  John Albree;  Edward Jacob Hathorne;  Thomas O Flynn;  John P. O'Brien;  Francis Anthony Strater;  Chauncey Thomas;  Lewis Wheaton Morse;  James Goodman;  Edward Finnerty;  Asa Spalding Weld.
 1884 -  Aldermen:  Oliver George Fernald;  James Henry Nugent Coundlman;  Malcolm Scollay Greenough;  John William McDonald;  Andrew Marathon Morton. — Common Council:  John E. Lynch;  William Henry Harrison Emmons;  John Henry Sullivan;  Michael G. Lynch;  Francis W. Curry;  Hugh E. Brady;  Elbridge Gerry Brown;  Lyman Haven Bigelow;  Thomas Hinds Green;  Patrick Kearins;  John Doherty;  William Taylor Jr;  William J. Reagan;  John E. McNellev;  Alfred D wight Foster;  Herbert Lee Harding;  Daniel Foster Farrar;  Michael H. Burke;  Henry J. McKee;  Samuel Kelley;  Dennis A.Horgan;  Charles Wilbur Whitcomb;  William J. Kilduff;  Lewis Grieve Farmer;  William McKinley Osborne;  Henry Phillips Oakman;  Frank E. Brigham;  James Granville Young Jr;  William Mackin.
 1885 -  Aldermen:  James Smith;  Patrick John Donovan;  Jeremiah Henry Mullane;  Charles Hastings Allen;  Benjamin French Cutter. — Common Council:  Bedfield Erskine;  William Henry Murphy;  George Nelson Fisher Jr;  William H. Miller;  William P. Henry;  Edward L. Quigley;  John Gallagher;  Richard J. Murray;  William Oscar Armstrong;  Benjamin B. Jenks;  Jacob Fottler;  Thomas Prince Beal;  Edward John Jenkins;  William Peter Cherrington;  William A. Daly;  James F. Murphy;  Thomas Joseph Keliher;  William English;  William Edward Hodgkins;   Thomas F. Fallon;  Patrick Edward Riddle;  Albert Watson Hersey; Henry S. Dewey;  Patrick Henry Costello;  Francis B. Kelley;  Edward Payson Butler;  John F. Brown.
 1886 -  Aldermen:  John Henry Sullivan; Michael Barr;  James Goldthwaite Freeman;  William Patrick Carroll;  Charles Michael Bromwich;  Patrick James Maguire;  Nathan Gilman Smith;  Henry Francis Coe;  Samuel John Capen. — Common Council:  Nathaniel March Jewett;  John Archibald Webster;  Thomas Owen McEnaney;  Benjamin Joseph Sullivan;  WardS;  Joseph H. Carroll;  Patrick Coyle;  Edwin F. Dunn;  Samuel J. Cochran;  Edward F. Reilly;  William J. Mahoney;  Christopher O. Brien;  Edward A. Rogan;  William Bernarden Francis Whall;  William Power Wilson;  Nathaniel Watson Ladd;  William Reuben Richards;  George Partridge Sanger Jr;  John J. Egan;  Edward Joseph Leary;  Edward J. Powers;  William Sarsfield McNary;  Robert Provan;  John W. Hayes;  Whittemore Rowell;  Alpheus Sanford;  Henry Frost;  Augustus Gordon Perkins;  Frank Bartlett Thayer;  Bartholomew J. Connolly;  Thomas Hugh Duggan;  James F. Davern;  John Murphy;  Cassius Clay Powers;  Julius D. Whipple;  Thomas Hendee Hickey;  Robert William Light; William Scollans.
 1887 -  Aldermen:  John Aloysius McLaughlin;  Tilly Haynes;  Charles Whipple Smith;  John Henry Lee. — Common Council:  Henry Carstensen;  Frank Robert Morrison;  Jeremiah F. Coleman;  Peter J. Gallagher;  John F. Sundberg;  Maurice Joseph McKenna;  Augustus L. Perry;  John J. Murphy;  Roger Haggerty;  Edward J. Harrington;  Thomas Francis Kelley;  John J. Kennedy;  Andrew Berkley Lattimore;  Frank Morison;  Edward Sullivan;  Cornelius Francis Desmond;  Thomas Francis Tracy;  John James Teevens;  Frank Jefferson Tuttle;  Michael Joseph Carroll;  Thomas Francis Nunan;  Robert Howard Bowman;  John William O Mealey;  Samuel Edward Shaw;  Ward;  James H. Sullivan;  Charles Havey Dolan;  John Homans Norton;  See No;  John Charles Short;  Richard Sullivan;  Lewis L. P. Atwood;  Sidney Leeland Burr;  George Robert Fowler;  Louis Munroe Clark;  Edmund Francis Snow;  John T. Chamberlain.
 1888 -  Aldermen:  Jesse Morse Gove;  Philip Joseph Doherty;  William Power Wilson;  James Ambrose Murphy;  Samuel Kelley;  John Charles Short;  Homer Rogers;  Otis Eddy. — Common Council:  Joseph Benjamin Maccabe;  Frank Casey;  Robert C. Fanning;  Frank Eugene Bagley;  Francis Henry Dillon;  Michael John Mitchell;  William Herbert Oakes;  Israel Frank Pierce;  Patrick Cannon;  Neil J. Gillespie;  Thomas Francis Keenan;  Joseph Patrick Lomasney;  George Wesley Boynton;  Charles Joseph Brooks;  Francis William Sprague;  James Means;  Frank Ellery Winslow;  James Bernard Hayes;  Jeremiah Stephen Mahoney;  Michael William Norris;  John McNamara;  James Francis Mullen;  William James Murphy;  William Henry Vialle;  William Stanford Stevens;  Thomas Francis Lyons;  John James Hoar;  John Patrick Kelley;  Horace Gwynne Allen;  William Gardner Reed;  Sidney Cushing;  Anton Peters;  Andrew J. Robinson;  John Comerford.
 1889 -  Aldermen:  Benjamin Franklin Stacey;  Albert Alonzo Folsom;  Homer Rogers;  William Gardner Reed. — Common Council:  Lewis Burnham;  John Andolph Campbell;  Frank Cushing Wood;  Patrick H. Quinn;  William Joseph Doherty;  Tobias Beck;  Edward Everett Drew;  Benjamin Franklin Hatch;  William Thomas Graham;  Neil Francis Doherty;  James Daniel Doherty;  James Joseph Donnelly;  Daniel Francis Breen;  Nathaniel Goddard Robinson;  Albert Harrison Hall;  Charles Edward Harris;  George von Lengerke Meyer;  Bowdoin Strong Parker;  Charles Franklin Sprague;  Perlie Appleton Dyar;  Francis Cabot Lowell;  Ira Loriston Moore;  John Francis Joseph Mulhall;  Charles James Chance;  Nicholas Francis McCarthy;  Samuel Hood Wise;  Edward Patrick Barry;  James M. O'Brien;  John Augustine Keefe;  William Warren Towle;  Maurice J. Hahlo;  George Evans Lovett;  Andrew Peter McCauley;  Benjamin Franklin Brown;  Melancthon Ware Burlen;  John Francis Kinney;  Frederick Peterson Knapp;  Franklin Plummer Pierce;  Walter Lawton Hayes;  Harlan Page Paige;  Henry B. Goodenough;  George Francis Mitchell.

1890–1899 

 1890 -  Aldermen:  Thomas William Flood;  Charles Burr Woolley;  Herbert Schaw Carruth;  Wesley Austin Gove;  Edward Joseph Leary;  Homer Rogers;  Sidney Cushing. — Common Council:  John Joseph Cotter;  Patrick Cornelius Kelly;  John Joseph Mahoney;  John Patrick Reed;  Henry Warren Woodbury;  James Gilfillian Jones;  Charles Carroll;  Edward William Dixon;  John James Irving;  Edward Patrick Clark;  James Benjamin Hamilton;  Michael Bartholomew Gilbride;  Arthur Langdon Spring;  Charles Wallace Hallstram;  Patrick Joseph Heffernin;  Daniel Patrick Toomey;  John Henry Griffin;  George Augustus Whiteley;   Jacob Nelson Goodnough;  Francis Edwin Park;  Osgood Chandler Blaney;  Joseph James Casey;  Isaac Paul Hutchinson; Abraham Captaine Ratshesky;  Thomas Talbot;  Paul Cuff Brooks;  Charles Henry Bryant;  Thomas Caldwell Thompson;  John Davidson Wayne;  Charles Edward Wiggin Jr;  Horace Bacon;  Bernice Jenkins Noyes;  James Benjamin Light;  Frederic Eaton.
 1891 -  Aldermen:  Thomas Francis Keenan;  George von Lengerke Meyer;  Nathaniel Johnson Rust;  Weston Lewis;  Martin Regan;  Lewis Grieve Farmer. — Common Council:  John L. Bates;  Hugh L. Stalker;  Thomas Arthur;  William J. Donovan;  Michael J. Tierney;  William H. Boardman;  Myron D. Cressy;  John Hurley;  James W. O Brien;  Elliott D. Robbins;  Patrick F. Brogan;  Cornelius H. Toland;  Patrick Higgins;  Hugh McLaughlin;  Nelson G. Gaskins;  Seth P. Smith;  Clarence P. Weston;  Frank H. Briggs;  John Quinn Jr;  Andrew J. Quinn;  James H. Coughlin;  John A. Daunt;  Josiah S. Dean;  Charles H. Dirksmeyer;  Timothy J. Sullivan;  John B. Cadigan;  Abraham Levy;  William R. Browne;  William Gordon;  Mark H. Lynch;  Hugh Gilligan;  William B. McClellan;  George H. Murray;  Frank F. Proctor;  John J. Kane;  Charles E. Folsom Jr Aldemian;  Fred H. Young.
 1892 -  Aldermen:  Michael John Mitchell; Jacob Fottler;  William Alonzo Folsom;  John Francis Dever. — Common Council:  James A. Cochran;  Cornelius J. Flynn;  Frank McGinniss;  John M. O Hara;  Albert W. Forbush;  Frank A. Teeling;  John F. Fitzgerald;  Cornelius Doherty;  Timothy F. Murphy;  William Francis Donovan;  Walden Banks;  Sidney B. Everett;  William C. Parker;  Royal Robbins;  Michael T. Callahan;  William J. Welch;  John Merrill;  William J. Sullivan;  Frederick S. Gore;  John J. Healy;  James Keenan;  Charles H. Reinhart;  Charles E. Clark;  Andrew J. Patterson;  Nicholas J. Quinn;  Albert C. Smith;  Hubert B. Curley;  Thomas H. Boyd; Albert C. Burrage;  George M. Scates;  Frederick C. Bleiler;  William F. Finneran;  Patrick F. Gormley;  Edward F. Draper;  John B. Patterson;  Edward Farrell;  Frank H. Ricker.
 1893 - Aldermen:  Charles Thomas Witt;  Martin Michael Lomasney;  John J. Maguire;  Alpheus Sanford;  William L. Mooney;  Charles Wallace Hallstram;  Charles Edward Folsom. — Common Council:  George R. W. Battis;  David H. Jones Jr;  Manassah E. Bradley;  Michael W. Collins;  William H. Fallon;  Timothy J. Donovan;  William H. Marnell;  Jeremiah E. Mahoney;  Christopher F. O Brien;  Daniel D. Rourke;  Bernard McMackin;  David T. King;  Charles H. Hall;  Joshua B. Holden;  Timothy J. Crowley;  John B. Collins;  William E. Mansfield;  John P. O Connor;  Daniel A. McCarthy;  William Berwin;  Freeman O. Emerson;  John H. Colby;  Henry S. Fisher;  Charles C. Collins;  Norman Mintz;  Michael J. Lyons;  Albert Wise;  Richard F. Andrews Jr;  Walter C. Brown;  Charles J. Jacobs;  William A. Davis;  James H. Kelly;  Herbert M. Manks;  George I. Robinson Jr;  J. Harris Aubin;  Samuel H. Mitchell.
 1894 - Aldermen:  Charles Henry Bryant;  Bordman Hall;  Edward Webb Presho;  David Franklin Barry. — Common Council:  John W. Hayes;  Michael J. Leary;  Peter F. Tague;  Martin F. Connorton;  William J. Miller;  James T. Roche;  Patrick J. Carroll;  George F. Coleman;  Daniel A. Whelton;  J. Henderson Allston;  Stanley Ruffin;  Calvin M. Lewis;  Edward H. McGuire;  Walter L. Sears;  John J. Browne;  John E. Baldwin;  Jeffrey R. Eager;  Michael J. Reidy;  Timothy J. Wholey;  Joseph L. Bartlett;  Daniel F. Connor;  Edwin S. Fields;  William W. Davis;  William M. Mclnness;  Edward H. Costello;  Thomas Reynolds;  Frederick A. Wood;  Eugene A. Reed Jr.
 1895 -  Aldermen:  Perlie Appleton Dyar;  Horace Gwynne Allen. — Common Council:  Joseph H. Barnes Jr;  John E. Lowden;  Joseph H. Corny;  John L. Kelly;  James F. Haley;  John J. O'Callaghan;  George A. Garland;  William E. Mahoney;  James J. Brock;  James A. Doherty;  James C. Murphy;  Simon Hirshon;  John R. Foster;  Edward S. Crockett;  George U. Crocker;  Timothy J. Butler;  William H. Woods;  John H. Dunn;  Edward C. Cadigan;  John J. Mahoney;  Patrick Bowen;  John J. Gartland Jr;  Benjamin C. Lane;  John W. Johnson;  G. Waldon Smith;  George W. Bennett;  Michael E. Gaddis;  Timothy E. McCarthy;  Samuel C. Jones;  Alfred Newmarch;  Chauncey K. Bullock;  Edward Orchard;  Franklin L. Codman;  Walter W. Strangman;  William M. Farrington;  Francis F. Morton.
 1896 -  Aldermen:  Samuel Darius Charles;  William Francis Donovan; William Joseph Donovan;  John Joseph Mahoney. — Common Council:  Collingwood C. Millar;  William B. Whitney;  John E. McCarthy;  Dennis J. Falvey;  John A. Ryan;  James H. Shannon;  Michael J. McColgan;  John A. Rowan;  Francis J. Horgan;  Daniel J. Kiley;  Nelson I. Southwick;  Alfred H. Colby;  Alfred F. Kenney;  John J. Falvey;  Hugh W. Bresnahan;  James T. Mahoney Jr;  Patrick J. O Toole;  William P.  Hickey;  Thomas F. Donovan;  John Dugan;  David F. McCarthy;  George G. Banchor; Charles Hiller Innes;  Sidney Moulthorp;  Arthur G. Wood; Thomas L. Noonan;  George Whittaker;  Timothy L. Connolly;  Albert C. Sawyer;  Charles P. Nangle;  Charles W. Dennis;  John A. Maier Jr;  Thomas C. Bachelder;  Elmer E. Chain.
 1897 -  Aldermen:  William Berwin;  Franklin Lincoln Codman;  John Henry Colby;  Josiah Stevens Dean;  William Henry Lott;  Milton Coburn Paige. — Common Council:  Charles I. Albee;  A. Dudley Bagley;  William J. Cronin;  James H. Donovan;  Henry B. Carroll;  John I. Toland;  John W. Donahue;  Joseph A. Turnbull;  Michael J. Donovan; W. T. A. Fitzgerald;  Thomas Mackey;  William H. Roth;  Louis Sonnabend;  Michael Leonard;  Maurice J. McCarthy;  George S. Brooks;  Walter E. Nichols;  Charles R. Saunders;  George H. Tinkham;  John B. Dumond;  Edward P. Sands;  James F. Mulcahy;  Daniel V. Mclsaac;  Oliver F. Davenport;  Frederick W. Farwell;  Arthur P. Russell;  John P. Lanergan;  James J. Casey;  John H. Daly;  John F. Dempsey;  John J. Flanagan;  Wilbur F. Adams;  Edwin D. Bell;  Louis T Ho;  Charles F. Adams;  William Dallow Jr;  Konrad Young;  William E. Harvey;  Willard W. Hibbard;  Harry B. Whall;  Ezra N. Rolland;  William D. Wheeler.
 1898 -  Aldermen:  Michael Henry Cleary;  Joseph Aloysius Conry;  Edward William Dixon;  Joseph James Norton;  Frank John O Toole. — Common Council:  Joseph F. Hickey;  William F. Harrington;  Charles A. Horrigan;  John F. Desmond;  John P. Sullivan;  William E. Bennett;  Edward H. Madden;  Samuel H. Borofsky;  Daniel J. Donnelly;  John L. Donovan;  William H. Cuddy;  Michael F. Hart;  Frank H. Cowin;  Samuel Kasanof;  Charles A. Atkins;  David R. Robinson;  Edward A. Armistead;  William S. B. Stevens;  David B. Chamberlain;  Thomas J. Collins;  Michael J. Lydon;  John D. Fenton;  William Martin;  Charles E. Eddy;  Patrick H. Brennan;  John J. Curley;  James A. Watson;  Michael T. Athridge;  Frederick W. Klemm;  Paul F. Folsom;  Abram Jordan;  Andrew Brauer;  Clarence W. Sanderson,.
 1899 -  Aldermen:  Wilbur Fiske Adams;  Michael William Brick;  Frederick William Day;  James Henry Doyle;  Patrick Francis McDonald. — Common Council: George H. Battis;  David W. Simpson;  Frank J. Johnson;  Thomas F. Rice;  Francis J. Doherty;  Thomas A. Kelley;  John F. Gibbons;  Andrew A. Badaracco;  Patrick H. Bradley;  William J. O Brien;  James H. Stone;  James A. Sweeney;  Martin Leftovith;  John J. Tobin;  John Bordman Jr;  Walter R. Mansfield;  George H. Moore;  Lawrence M. Stockton;  Donald N. MacDonald;  Arthur K. Peck;  Frank J. Linehan;  George A. Donahoe; Edward L. Logan;  John H. Giblin,  A;  Frank S. Atwood;  Frank E. Wells;  George A. Flynn;  William H. Doyle;  James Mclnerney;  George R. Miller;  George O. Wood;  Fred A. Emery;  Temple A. Winsloe;  George W. Lorey;  William G. Roemer;  John H. Broderick;  Guy F. Newhall;  Samuel H. Mildram.

1900–1909 

 1900 -  Aldermen:  Philip O Brien;  Patrick Bowen;  Michael William Norris;  Michael Joseph O Brien;  George Holden Tinkham;  Robert Anson Jordan;  Edwin Peabody Gerry. — Common Council:  William B. Jackson;  William C. S. Healey;  Daniel J. Sheehan;  William J. Carley;  George H. Cadigan;  Arthur W. Dolan;  John C. Hurley;  Thomas J. Grady;  Daniel L. Flanagan;  Osborn A. Newton;  Harry S. Upham;  Lawrence J. Kelly;  John E. L. Monaghan;  J. Frank O Hare;  William L. White;  William McG Grant;  James M. Curley;  William E. Good;  Michael W. Kelley;  William O. S. Hennigan;  William M. Curtis;  Clarence W. Starratt;  William H. Nitz;  William L. Strickland;  Walter E. Henderson;  J. Henry Smith;  Frederick W. Whiteley;  Herbert W. Burr;  William E. Hannan; Frank H. Howe.
 1901 -  Aldermen:  John Lawrence Kelly;  George Robert Miller;  Joseph Irving Stewart. — Common Council:  Walter J. Staples;  Joseph F. Carter;  Thomas F. Clark;  Edward L. Cauley;  Henry M. Wing;  Ward A;  Philip C. McMahon; John J. Mullen;  Frank P. Murphy;  Maurice J. Power;  Henry S. Fitzgerald; George A. Scigliano;  James F. McDermott;  John L. Sullivan;  Hyman Weinberg;  John L. Curry;  Edward F. Fitzgerald;  Harry Alexander;  James F. Phelan;  March G. Bennett,;  Robert Homans;  S. William Simms;  Frank E. Gaylord;  Andrew L. O Toole;  Patrick J. Shiels;  John J. Teevens Jr;  William E. Hickey;  James M. Lane;  William H. Gavin;  Hugh J. Young;  William H. Murphy;  William J. Barrett;  Thomas E. Raftery;  John F. Egan;  Peter A. Hoban;  Bernard W. Kenney;  Frank W. Thayer;  Edmund Weber;  Thomas D. Roberts;  George P. Beckford;  Edward J. Bromberg;  Edward W. Brown;  George McKee.
 1902 -  Aldermen:  Edward Louis Quigley;  Thomas Henry Dowd;  Charles Henry Slattery;  Frederick Walter Farwell;  Timothy Edward McCarthy;  William Blackman Heath. — Common Council:  Robert J. Gove;  James J. Donnelly;  John J. Flaherty;  John J. Conway;  Daniel J. McDonald;  Peter A. McDonald;  George A. Murdock;  Philip J. McGonagle;  William A. H. Crowley;  Joseph A. Maynard;  Aaron E. Myers;  Guy W. Cox;  Daniel W. Lane;  Everett H. Jenney;  Edward F. McGrady; Robert J. Ware;  Charles E. Walsh;  Arthur L. Gavin;  William J. Lyons;  Jeremiah J. Good;  John F. Hoar;  Martin Milmore;  David M. Owens;  John J. Burke;  John Grauman;  John J. Conway;  Henry S. Clark.
 1903 -  Aldermen:  James Francis Nolan;  Hugh William Bresnahan;  John Joseph Flanagan;  Henry Adams Frothingham;  Fred Eldridge Bolton;  Edward Justin Bromberg. — Common Council:  Thomas H. Dalton;  Gilbert M. Stalker;  John D. Cadogan;  John F. Collins;  James E. Fitzgerald;  Patrick J. Long;  Thomas J. McMackin;  William J. Foley; David Mancovitz;  Robert J. McKirdy;  Frank J. Gethro;  Edward N. Lacey;  George Nicols;  Charles W. M. Williams;  Fred A. Ewell;  Eugene T. Brazzell;  William L. Newton;  William J. Drummond;  Joseph H. Reagan;  Thomas B. Bradley;  Clement H. Coleman;  Charles M. Callahan;  John M. McDonald;  Theodore A. Glynn;  William P. Grady;  Thomas J. Fay;  William H. Curley;  Michael A. Spillane;  Tilton S. Bell;  Thomas Leavitt;  Edwin T. McKnight;  John E. Crook;  William F. Howes;  William H. Jordan;  Gideon B. Abbott;  Charles Patterson;  Joseph B. Brown;  Hammond B. Hazelwood;  Edward M. Richardson.
 1904 -  Aldermen:  John Edward Baldwin,  No;  James Michael Curley;  William John Hennessey;  Fred James Kneeland;  Daniel Aloysius Whelton. — Common Council:  William G. Harrington;  Lewis B. McKie;  Edward F. Colbert;  Joseph F. Crowley;  Michael J. Eagan;  Thomas F. Fitzgerald;  William F. Murray Jr;  Max L. Rachkowsky;  John W. Craig;  Daniel L. Sullivan;  J. Bernard Ferber;  Philip S. Dalton;  Myron E. Pierce;  Humphrey J. Collins;  Nathan B. McLoud;  James J. Moynihan;  John J. Driscoll; Timothy J. Sullivan Jr;  George F. Coughlin;  James J. Conboy;  William J. Gleason;  Joseph P. Good;  James J. Kelley;  Charles F. Mackenzie;  Sherwin L. Cook;  Fred P. Warner;  Matthew J. Hanley;  Jeremiah J. Hourin;  Paul L. Jepson;  James A. Price;  James Oliver Higgins;  Patrick H. Barry;  Francis B. McKinney.
 1905  -  Aldermen:  Edward Lawrence Cauley;  Louis Munroe Clark;  Frank J. Linehan. — Common Council:  Robert E. Sexton;  Ernest W. Woodside;  William G. Donovan;  Michael H. Fitzgerald;  Bernard F. Hanrahan;  William E. Magurn;  Joseph M. Sullivan; Alfred J. Lill Jr;  Jeremiah J. McCarthy;  David T. Montague;  Malcolm E. Nichols;  James B. Noyes;  Isaac L. Roberts;  William E. Chester;  Florence H. Fitzgerald;  Leo F. McCullough;  Thomas P. McDavitt;   Thomas F. Coogan,;  James J. Hughes;  Hugh Mealey Jr;  Patrick H. O Connor;  John P. Noonan; Thomas M. Joyce;  Daniel J. Cuttey Jr;  Samuel J. Madden;  Timothy F. Murphy;  Charles E. Beatty;  James J. McCarty;  John J. Shea Jr;  George W. Carruth;  Harry B. Fowler;  J. Henry Leonard;  William E. Cose;  Edward C. Webster.
 1906 -  Aldermen:  Francis Reginald Bangs; George H. Battis;  Tilton Stuart Bell;  Charles Martin Draper. — Common Council:  Edward C. R. Bagley;  Thomas F. Doherty;  Joseph E. Donovan;  James E. Ducey;  John J. Hayes;  John J. McDermott;  J. Frank O Brien;  Joseph Santosuosso;  Bartholomew A. Brickley;  Matthew J. Dacey;  Jacob Rosenberg;  John S. Driscoll;  John B. McGregor;  Patrick D. McGrath;  John Troy;  John D. McGivern,;  William S. Bramhall;  Charles A. Clark;  Donald J. Ferguson;  E. Howard George;  Joseph H. Wentworth;  William C. Clark;  Edward M. Green;  William B. Willcutt.
 1907 - Aldermen:  Frederick Andrew Finigan;  Daniel Lawrence Flanagan, Michael John Leary;  William Henry Woods. — Common Council:  Theodore L. Sorenson;  Joseph H. Pendergast;  John J. McCormack;  James A. Hatton;  John J. Buckley;  James T. Purcell;  John T. Kennedy;  Edward D. Spellman;  Joseph Leonard;  Solomon Sacks;   George P. Anderson;  Joseph W. Wharton;  George T. Daley;  Augustus D. McLennan;  James J. Doyle;  Edward T. J. Noonan;  Cornelius J. Fitzgerald;  Thomas F. O Brien; Francis L. Colpoys;  John L. Costello;  James H. Kelly;  Francis L. Daly;  Frederick J. J. Sheenan;  Daniel F. Cronin,;  Michael F. O Brien;  William J. Kohler;  Charles T. Harding;  William N. Hackett;  William H. Morgan;  George Penshorn;  George M. Brown;  Earl E. Davidson;  George C. McCabe;  Axel E. Zetterman.
 1909: George C. McCabe, President; Edward C. R. Bagley;  J. Henderson Allston;  Daniel F. Cronin;  Frank A. Goodwin;  Channing H. Cox;  Michael F. O'Brien;  Joseph A. Hoey;  William S. Kinney;  George Kenney; Joseph H. Pendergast; Courtenay Crocker;  Peter A. Hoban;  Dannis A. O'Neil;  Theodore Hoague;  William J. Kohler;  Michael J. Brophy;  Charles H. Moore;  John J. Donovan; James J. Brennan;  Seth Fenelon Arno;  Charles T. Harding;  Joseph A. Dart;  Alfred G. Davis;  Harry H. Cumming;  William J. Murray;  Francis J. H. Jones;  William Smith Jr.; Francis M. Ducey;  Leo F. McCullough;  William N. Hackett;  Patrick B. Carr;  Stephen A. Welch;  John Ballantyne;  James I. Green;  Coleman E. Kelly;  Walter R. Meins; John J. Buckley;  Cornelius J. Fitzgerald;  William H. Morgan; William E. Carney;  Thomas J. Casey;  George Penshorn;  Edward A. Troy;  Joseph L. Collins;  Bernhard G. Krug; Stephen Gardella;  John O'Hara;  George W. Carruth;  Francis D. O'Donnell;  William T. Conway;  George W. Smith;  Alfred Scigliano;  Joseph A. O'Bryan;  Ward D. Prescott; John L. Donovan;  John D. McGivern;  Frank B. Crane;  John T. Kennedy;  Hugh M. Garrity;  James A. Hart;  Dominick F.;  Spellman;  William D. McCarthy;  Clifford C. Best; James J. Ryan;  Thomas M. Joyce;  Edward C. Webster;  James A. Bragan;  Francis J. Brennan;  George C. McCabe;  Adolphus M. Burroughs;  John D. Connors;  Charles H. Warren; Issac Gordon;  Joseph O'Kane, Clerk;  Robert J. Howell;  Thomas B. McKeagney.

1910–1919 

 1910:  Walter Ballantyne, President;  John J. Attridge;  James M. Curley;  Frederick J. Brand;  Matthew Hale;  Daniel J. McDonald;  Walter L. Collins;  Thomas J. Kenny;  Timothy J. Buckley.
 1911:  Daniel J. McDonald;  John J. Attridge;  James M. Curley;  Timothy J. Buckley;  Matthew Hale;  Walter Ballantyne;  Ernest E. Smith;  Walter L. Collins;  Thomas J. Kenny.
 1912:  John J. Attridge, President;  Walter Ballantyne;  Daniel J. McDonald;  Thomas J. Kenny;  Timothy J. Buckley;  Matthew Hale;  John A. Coulthurst;  Ernest E. Smith;  Walter L. Collins.
 1913:  Thomas J. Kenny, President;  John J. Attridge;  Walter Ballantyne;  Daniel J. McDonald;  Walter L. Collins; Timothy J. Buckley;  James A. Watson;  John A. Coulthurst;  Ernest E. Smith.
 1914:  Daniel J. Mcdonald, President;   John J. Attridge;  Walter Ballantyne;  George W. Coleman;  Walter L. Collins;  Thomas J. Kenny;  William H. Woods;  James A. Watson;  John A. Coulthurst.
 1915:  George E. Coleman, President;  Walter Ballantyne;  George W. Coleman;  John J. Attridge;  John A. Coulthurst;  Daniel J. McDonald;  Walter L. Collins;  Henry E. Hagan;  William H. Woods;  James A. Watson; James J. Storrow.
 1916:  Henry E. Hagan, President;  John J. Attridge;  Walter Ballantyne;  Daniel J. McDonald;  Walter L. Collins;  John A. Coulthurst;  George W. Coleman;  James Storrow;  Thomas J. Kenny; Geoffrey B. Lehy.
 1917:  James J. Storrow, President;  Fran J. W. Ford;  John J. Attridge;  Walter Ballantyne;  Daniel J. McDonald;  Walter L. Collins;  Henry E. Hagan;  James A. Watson;  Alfred E. Wellington.
 1918:  Wavier L. Collins, President;  Henry E. Hagan;  Francis J. W. Ford;  John J. Attridge;  Daniel W. Lane;  Daniel J. McDonald;  Walter L. Collins;  James T. Moriarty;  James A. Watson;  James J. Storrow.
 1919:  Francis J. W. Ford, President;  Walter L. Collins;  Henry E. Hagan;  John A. Donoghue;  Daniel W. Lane;  Daniel J. McDonald; Edward F. McLaughlin;  James T. Moriarty;  James A. Watson.

1920–1929 

 1920:  James T. Moriarty, President;  David J. Brickley;  Walter L. Collins;  Henry E. Hagan;  Francis J. W. Ford;  John A. Donoghue;  Daniel W. Lane;  James A. Watson;  Edward F. McLaughlin.
 1921:  James W. Watson, President;  Henry E. Hagan;  David J. Brickley;  Walter L. Collins;  Daniel W. Lane;  Francis J. W. Ford;  John A. Donoghue;  James T. Moriarty;  James A. Watson;  Edward F. McLaughlin.
 1922:  David J. Buckley, President;  John A. Donoghue;  Henry E. Hagan;  David J. Brickley;  George F. Gilbody;  Daniel W. Lane;  Francis J. W. Ford;  William J. Walsh;  James T. Moriarty;  James A. Watson.
 1923:  Daniel W. Lane, President;  David J. Brickley;  John A. Donoghue;  Henry E. Hagan;  William C.S. Healey;  George F. Gilbody; James A. Watson;  William J. Walsh;  James T. Moriarty.
 1924:  John A. Donoghue, President;  Daniel W. Lane;  David J. Brickley;  James T. Moriarty;  William C.S. Healey;  George F. Gilbody;  James T. Purcell;  James A. Watson;  William J. Walsh.
 1925:  James T. Moriarty, President;  Daniel W. Lane;  David J. Brickley;  John A. Donoghue;  William C.S. Healey;  George F. Gilbody;  James T. Purcell;  James A. Watson;  William J. Walsh.

In November 1924, Boston voters approved replacing the 9-person City Council (all elected at-large) with a 22-person City Council (elected by wards). The first such election was held in November 1925, for terms starting in January 1926.

 1926:  Charles G. Keene, President;  Timothy F. Donovan; John F. Dowd;  Thomas W. Mcmahon;  Thomas H. Green;  Michael J. Ward;  George F. Gilbody; John I. Fitzgerald;  Walter J. Freeley;  Robert Gardiner Wilson Jr.;  Seth F. Arnold;  Edward L. Englert;  Walter E. Wragg;  Michael J. Mahoney;  Herman L. Bush;  Horace Guild; Henry Parkman Jr.; Joseph McGrath;  Frederick E. Dowling;  William G. Lynch;  Israel Ruby;  John J. Heffernan.
 1927:  John J. Heffernan, President;  Timothy F. Donovan;  John F. Dowd;  Thomas W. McMahon;  Thomas H. Green;  Michael J. Ward;  George F. Gilbody;  John I. Fitzgerald;  Walter J. Freeley;  Robert Gardiner Wilson Jr.;  Seth F. Arnold;  Edward L. Englert;  Walter E. Wragg;  Michael J. Mahoney;  Herman L. Bush;  Horace Guild;  Henry Parkman Jr.;  Joseph McGrath;  Charles C. Keene;  William G. Lynch;  Israel Ruby;  Frederic E. Dowling.
 1928:  Thomas H. Green, President;  Timothy F. Donovan;  Michael J. Ward;  Albert L. Fish;  John I. Fitzgerald;  Roger E. Deveney;  Robert Gardiner Wilson Jr.;  Seth F. Arnold;  William A. Motle Jr. Peter J. Murphy;  Henry Parkman Jr.;  Herman L. Bush;  Peter A. Murray;  Michael J. Mahoney;  Frank E. Sullivan;  Charles G. Keene;  William G. Lynch;  Israel Ruby;  Frederic E. Dowling;  John F. Dowd;  Thomas W. McMahon; Edward M. Gallagher.
 1929:  Timothy F. Donovan, President;  Thomas H. Green;  Michael J. Ward;  Albert L. Fish;  John I. Fitzgerald;  Roger E. Deveney;  Robert Cardiner Wilson Jr.;  Seth F. Arnold;  William A. Motley Jr. Peter J. Murphy;  Henry Parkman Jr.;  Herman L. Bush;  Peter A. Murray;  Michael J. Mahoney;  Frank E. Sullivan;  Charles G. Keene;  William G. Lynch;  Israel Ruby;  Frederic E. Dowling;  John F. Dowd;  Thomas W. McMahon; Edward M. Gallagher.

1930–1939 

 1930:  William G. Lynch, President;  Timothy F. Donovan;  Richard D. Gleason;  Albert L. Fish;  Thomas H. Green;  Leo F. Power;  Robert Gardiner Wilson Jr.;  John I. Fitzgerald;  Edward L. Englert;  Clement A. Norton;  Seth F. Arnold;  Herman L. Bush;  Peter A. Murray; Laurence Curtis;  Joseph McGrath;  Joseph P. Cox;  Michael J. Mahoney;  Israel Ruby;  James Hein;  John F. Dowd;  Francis E. Kelley;  Edward M. Gallagher.
 1931:  Joseph McGrath, President;  Timothy F. Donovan;  John F. Dowd;  Albert L. Fish;  Thomas H. Green;  Richard D. Gleason;  Robert Gardiner Wilson Jr.;  John I. Fitzgerald;  Leo F. Power;  Clement A. Norton;  Seth F. Arnold;  Edward L. Englert;  Peter A. Murray;  Laurence Curtis;  Herman L. Bush;  Joseph P. Cox;  Michael J. Mahoney;  Israel Ruby;  James Hein;  William G. Lynch;  Francis E. Kelley;  Edward M. Gallagher.
 1932:  Edward M. Gallagher, President;  William H. Barker;  John F. Dowd;  Albert L. Fish;  Thomas H. Green;  Richard D. Gleason;  Francis E. Kelley;  John I. Fitzgerald;  Leo F. Power;  Thomas Burke;  George W. Roberts;  Edward L. Englert;  Clement A. Norton;  Laurence Curtis;  David M. Brackman;  Peter A. Murray;  George P. Donovan;  Joseph McGrath;  Joseph P. Cox;  William G. Lynch;  Israel Ruby;  James Hein.
 1933:  Joseph Mcgrath, President;  William H. Barker;  John F. Dowd;  Albert L. Fish;  Thomas II Green;  Richard D. Gleason;  Thomas Burke;  John I. Fitzgerald;  Leo F. Power;  Clement A. Norton;  George W. Roberts;  Edward L. Englert;  Peter A. Murray;  Laurence Curtis;  David M. Brackman;  Joseph P. Cox;  George P. Donovan;  Israel Ruby;  James Hein;  William G. Lynch;  Francis E. Kelley;  Edward M. Gallagher.
 1934:  John A. Dowd, President;  Henry Selvitella;  Richard D. Gleason;  Albert L. Fish;  Thomas H. Green;  John J. Doherty;  Robert Gardiner Wilson Jr.;  John I. Fitzgerald;  Edward L. Englert;  Clement A. Norton;  George W. Roberts;  David M. Brackman;  Peter A. Murray;  Henry Lee Shattuck;  Joseph McGrath;  James F. Finley;  George P. Donovan;  Maurice M. Goldman; James E. Agnew; John E. Kerrigan;  Martin H. Tobin;  Edward M. Gallagher.
 1935:  John I. Fitzgerald, President;  Henry Selvitella;  Richard D. Gleason;  Albert L. Fish;  Thomas H. Green;  John J. Doherty;  Robert Cardiner Wilson Jr.;  George W. Roberts;  Edward L. Englert;  Clement A. Norton;  Henry L. Shattuck;  David M. Brackman;  Peter A. Murray;  George P. Donovan;  Joseph McGrath;  James F. Finley;  John E. Kerrigan;  Maurice M. Goldman;  James E. Agnew;  John F. Dowd;  Martin H. Tobin;  Edward M. Gallagher.
 1936:  John I. Fitzgerald, President;  Henry Selvitella;  Richard D. Gleason;  John J. McGrath;  James J. Mellen;  John J. Doherty;  Robert Gardiner Wilson Jr.;  George W. Roberts;  James J. Kilroy;  Clement A. Norton;  Henry L. Shattuck;  David M. Brackman;  Peter J. Murphy;  George A. Murray;  Peter J. Fitzgerald;  James F. Finley;  John E. Kerrigan;  Sidney Rosenberg;  James E. Agnew;  John F. Dowd;  Martin H. Tobin;  Edward M. Gallagher.
 1937:  John I. Fitzgerald, President;  Henry Selvitella;  Mildred M. Harris;  John J. McGrath;  James J. Mellen;  John J. Doherty;  Robert Gardiner Wilson Jr.;  George W. Roberts;  James J. Kilroy;  Clement A. Norton;  Henry L. Shattuck;  David M. Brackman;  Peter A. Murray;  George A. Murray;  Peter J. Fitzgerald;  James F. Finley;  John E. Kerrigan;  Sidney Rosenberg;  James E. Agnew;  John F. Dowd;  Martin H. Tobin;  Edward M. Gallagher.
 1938:  John E. Kerrigan, President;  Francis W. Irwin;  Mildred M. Harris;  Philip Austin Fish;  William J. Galvin;  William A. Carey;  Robert Gardiner Wilson Jr.;  John I. Fitzgerald;  Edward L. Englert;  Clement A. Norton;  Perlie Dyar Chase;  Charles I. Taylor;  Peter A. Murray;  Henry L. Shattuck;  Edward A. Hutchinson Jr. Theodore F. Lyons;  George A. Murray;  Sydney Rosenberg;  James E. Agnew;  John F. Dowd; John B. Kelly;  Maurice H. Sullivan.
 1939:  George A. Murray, President;  Francis W. Irwin;  Mildred M. Harris;  Philip Austin Fish;  William J. Galvin;  William A. Carey;  Robert Gardiner Wilson Jr.;  John I. Fitzgerald;  Edward L. Englert;  Clement A. Norton;  Perlie Dyar Chase;  Charles I. Taylor;  James M. Langan;  Henry L. Shattuck;  Edward A. Hutchinson Jr. Theodore F. Lyons;  John E. Kerrigan;  Sidney Rosenberg;  James E. Agnew;  George F. McMahon;  John B. Kelly;  Maurice H. Sullivan.

1940–1949 

 1940–1941:  William J. Galvin, President;  James S. Coffey;  Daniel F. Sullivan;  Philip Austin Fish;  Joseph Russo;  William A. Carey;  John C. Wickes;  Perlie Dyar Chase;  Edward L. Englert;  James J. Goode Jr.;  Henry L. Shattuck;  Charles I. Taylor;  James M. Langan;  Joseph M. Scannell;  Edward A. Hutchinson Jr. Theodore F. Lyons;  Thomas E. Linehan;  Joseph J. Gottlieb;  Michael J. Ward;  William F. Hurley;  John B. Kelly;  Maurice H. Sullivan.
 1942:  Thomas E. Linehan, President;  James S. Coffey;  Daniel F. Sullivan;  Philip Austin Fish;  Michael L. Kinsella;  William A. Carey;  John C. Wickes;  Joseph Russo;  Matthew F. Hanley;  James J. Goode Jr.;  Perlie Dyar Chase;  Charles I. Taylor;  James M. Langan;  A. Frank Foster;  Thomas J. Hannon; Theodore F. Lyons;  Joseph M. Scannell;  Joseph J. Gottlieb;  William F. Dwyer;  William F. Hurley;  John B. Kelly;  Maurice H. Sullivan.
 1943:  Thomas J. Hannon, President;  James S. Coffey;  William F. Hurley;  Philip Austin Fish;  Michael L. Kinsella;  Daniel F. Sullivan;  John C. Wickes;  Joseph Russo;  William A. Carey;  James J. Goode Jr.;  Perlie Dyar Chase;  Matthew F. Hanley;  James M. Langan;  A. Frank Foster;  Charles I. Taylor;  Theodore F. Lyons;  Joseph M. Scannell; Isadore H. Y. Muchnick; William F. Dwyer;  Thomas E. Linehan;  John B. Kelly;  Maurice H. Sullivan.
 1944:  John E. Kerrigan, President;  James S. Coffey;  Daniel F. Sullivan;  Philip Austin Fish;  Michael Leo Kinsella;  William A. Carey;  William Joseph Keenan;  Joseph Russo;  Matthew F. Hanley; Michael Paul Feeney;  Perlie Dyar Chase;  Charles I. Taylor;  Thomas L. McCormack;  James C. Bayley Jr.;  Thomas J. Hannon;  Thomas G. J. Shannon;  Joseph M. Scannell;  Isadore H.Y. Muchnick; William F. Dwyer;  William F. Hurley;  John B. Kelly;  Maurice H. Sullivan.
 1945:  John E. Kerrigan, President;  James S. Coffey;  Daniel F. Sullivan;  Philip Austin Fish;  Michael Leo Kinsella;  William A. Carey;  William Joseph Keenan;  Joseph Russo;  Matthew F. Hanley;  Michael Paul Feeney;  Perlie Dyar Chase;  Charles I. Taylor;  Thomas L. McCormack;  James C. Bayley Jr.;  Thomas J. Hannon;  Thomas G. J. Shannon;  Joseph M. Scannell;  Isadore H. Y. Muchnick; William F. Dwyer;  William F. Hurley;  John B. Kelly;  Maurice H. Sullivan.
 1946:  John B. Kelly, President;  James F. Coffey;  William F. Hurley;  Philip Austin Fish;  Michael Leo Kensella;  Daniel F. Sullivan;  William Joseph Keenan;  Joseph Russo;  William A. Carey;  Michael H. Cantwell;  Perlie Dyar Chase;  William A. Moriarty;  Thomas L. McCormack;  James C. Bayley Jr.;  Milton Cook;  Walter D. Bryan;  Joseph M. Scannell;  Thomas J. Hannon;  Edmund V. Lane;  Thomas E. Linehan;  Isadore H. Y. Muchnick; Edward C. Madden.
 1947: John B. Kelly, President;  James S. Coffey;  William F. Hurley;  Philip Austin Fish;  Michael Leo Kinsella;  Daniel F. Sullivan;  William Joseph Keenan;  Joseph Russo;  William A. Carey;  Michael H. Cantwell;  Perlie Dyar Chase;  William A. Moriarty;  Thomas L. McCormack;  James C. Bayley Jr.;  Milton Cook;  Walter D. Bryan;  Joseph M. Scannell;  Thomas J. Hannon;  Edmund V. Lane;  Thomas E. Linehan;  Isadore H. Y. Muchnick; Edward C. Madden.
 1948:  Thomas J. Hannon, President;  James S. Coffey;  William F. Hurley;  John J. Beades;  Michael Leo Kinsella;  Daniel F. Sullivan;  William Joseph Keenan;  George T. Lanigan;  William A. Carey;  Michael H. Cantwell;  Perlie Dyar Chase;  Philip A. Tracy;  Thomas L. McCormack; John Yerxa;  Milton Cook;  Walter D. Bryan;  John B. Wenzler; Julius Ansel;  Edmund V. Lane;  Thomas E. Linehan;  Robert J. Ramsey;  Vincent J. Shanley.
 1949:  William F. Hurley, President;  James S. Coffey;  Daniel F. Sullivan;  John J. Beades;  Michael Leo Kinsella;  William A. Carey;  William Joseph Keenan;  George T. Lanigan;  Philip A. Tracy;  Michael H. Cantwell;  Perlie Dyar Chase;  Milton Cook;  Thomas L. McCormack;  John E. Yerxa;  Thomas J. Hannon;  Walter D. Bryan;  John B. Wenzler;  Julius Ansel;  Edmund Lane;  Thomas E. Linehan;  Robert J. Ramsey;  Vincent J. Shanley.

1950–1959 

 1950: William F. Hurley, President;  James S. Coffey;  Daniel F. Sullivan;  John J. Beades;  Michael Leo Kinsella;  Francis P. Tracey;  Anthony J. Farin;  George T. Lanigan;  Philip A. Tracy;  Michael H. Cantwell;  Perlie Dyar Chase;  Milton Cook;  Thomas L. McCormack;  John E. Yerxa;  Thomas J. Hannon;  Walter D. Bryan;  John B. Wenzler;  Julius Ansel;  Edmund Lane;  Thomas E. Linehan;  Robert J. Ramsey;  Vincent J. Shanley;  John J. McColgan.
 1951: William F. Hurley, President;  James S. Coffey;  Laurence H. Banks;  John J. Beades;  Michael Leo Kinsella;  Francis P. Tracey;  Anthony J. Farin;  George T. Lanigan;  Philip A. Tracy;  Michael H. Cantwell;  Perlie Dyar Chase;  Milton Cook;  Thomas L. McCormack;  John E. Yerxa;  Thomas J. Hannon;  Walter D. Bryan;  John B. Wenzler;  Julius Ansel;  Edmund Lane;  John J. McColgan;  Robert J. Ramsey;  Vincent J. Shanley;  Daniel F. Sullivan.

In November 1949, Boston voters approved changes to municipal elections, including replacing the 22-person City Council (elected by wards) with a 9-person City Council (all elected at-large). The first such election was held in November 1951, for terms starting in January 1952.

 1952: Gabriel F. Piemonte, President; Francis X. Ahearn;  William F. Hurley;  William J. Foley Jr.;  Francis X. Joyce;  Michael J. Ward;  Frederick C. Hailer Jr.;  John E. Kerrigan; Joseph C. White.
 1953:  Francis X. Ahearn, President;  William F. Hurley;  Gabriel F. Piemonte;  Francis X. Joyce;  Michael J. Ward; Michael H. Cantwell; William J. Foley Jr.;  John E. Kerrigan;  Joseph C. White;  Frederick C. Hailer Jr.
 1954:  Joseph C. White, President;  Francis X. Ahearn;  William F. Hurley;  Edward F. McLaughlin Jr.;  William J. Foley Jr.;  John E. Kerrigan;  Gabriel F. Piemonte;  Frederick C. Hailer Jr.; Edward J. McCormack Jr.
 1955: William F. Hurley, President;  Francis X. Ahearn;  Edward F. McLaughlin Jr.;  William J. Foley Jr.;  John E. Kerrigan;  Gabriel F. Piemonte;  Frederick C. Hailer Jr.;  Edward J. McCormack Jr. Joseph C. White.
 1956:  Edward J. McCormack Jr., President;  Francis X. Ahearn;  John E. Kerrigan;  Edward F. McLaughlin Jr.;  John F. Collins; Gabriel F. Piemonte;  William J. Foley Jr.; Patrick F. McDonough; Joseph C. White.
 1957:  William J. Foley Jr., President;  Francis X. Ahearn;  John E. Kerrigan;  Edward F. McLaughlin Jr.;  John F. Collins;  Edward J. McCormack Jr.; Gabriel F. Piemonte;  Patrick F. McDonough; Joseph C. White;  Frederick C. Hailer Jr.
 1958:  Patrick F. McDonough, President;  Christopher A. Iannella; Edward F. McLaughlin Jr.;  William J. Foley Jr.;  John E. Kerrigan;  Gabriel F. Piemonte;  Frederick C. Hailer Jr.;  Edward J. McCormack Jr.;  Joseph C. White; Peter F. Hines;  James S. Coffey.
 1959:  Edward F. McLaughlin Jr., President;  James S. Coffey;  Christopher A. Iannella;  William J. Foley Jr.;  John E. Kerrigan;  Gabriel F. Piemonte;  Peter F. Hines;  Patrick F. McDonough; Joseph C. White.
1. In September 1950, John J. McColgan won a special election to succeed Thomas E. Linehan as Ward 7's council representative after Linehan was appointed as a special justice of the South Boston Municipal Court.
2. In December 1953, Michael H. Cantwell served the final week of Michael J. Ward's term, when the latter retired.
3. In February 1957, John F. Collins was appointed Suffolk County register of probate. He was replaced on the City Council by Frederick C. Hailer Jr.
4. On April 21, 1958, Frederick C. Hailer Jr. resigned from the City Council. He was succeeded by James S. Coffey.
5. Following Edward F. McLaughlin Jr.'s election as Massachusetts Attorney General, he was replaced on the City Council by Peter F. Hines in September 1958.

1960–1969 
 1960:  Edward F. McLaughlin Jr., President;  James S. Coffey;  Peter F. Hines;  Patrick F. McDonough; John Patrick Connolly;  Christopher A. Iannella;  William J. Foley Jr.;  John E. Kerrigan;  Joseph C. White.
 1961: Patrick F. McDonough, President;  James S. Coffey;  Peter F. Hines;  John Patrick Connolly;  Christopher A. Iannella; Edward F. McLaughlin Jr.;  William J. Foley Jr.;  John E. Kerrigan;  Joseph C. White;  Thomas A. Sullivan; Frederick C. Langone
 1962:  Christopher A. Iannella, President;  James S. Coffey;  Gabriel F. Piemonte;  William J. Foley Jr.;  John E. Kerrigan;  Thomas A. Sullivan;  Peter F. Hines;  Patrick F. McDonough; John J. Tierney Jr.
 1963:  Peter F. Hines, President;  James S. Coffey;  Christopher A. Iannella; Gabriel F. Piemonte;  William J. Foley Jr.;  John E. Kerrigan;  Thomas A. Sullivan;  Patrick F. McDonough; John J. Tierney Jr.
 1964:  John J. Tierney, President; Katherine Craven;  Peter F. Hines;  John E. Kerrigan;  George F. Foley Jr.;  Barry T. Hynes;  Frederick C. Langone;  William J. Foley Jr.;  Christopher A. Iannella.
 1965: John J. Tierney, President;  Katherine Craven;  Peter F. Hines;  John E. Kerrigan;  George F. Foley Jr.;  Barry T. Hynes;  Frederick C. Langone;  William J. Foley Jr.;  Christopher A. Iannella.
 1966:  Frederick C. Langone, President;  Katherine Craven;  Barry T. Hynes;   William J. Foley Jr.;  Christopher A. Iannella; Patrick F. McDonough;  Peter F. Hines;  John E. Kerrigan;  Gabriel F. Piemonte.
 1967:  Barry T. Hynes, President;  Katherine Craven;  Frederick C. Langone;  William J. Foley Jr.;  Christopher A. Iannella; Patrick F. McDonough;  Peter F. Hines;  John E. Kerrigan;  Gabriel F. Piemonte.
 1968:  William J. Foley Jr., President; Thomas I. Atkins;  John E. Kerrigan; Gerald F. O'Leary Jr.;  Garrett M. Byrne;  Frederick C. Langone; John L. Saltonstall Jr.;  Patrick F. McDonough; Joseph F. Timilty.
 1969:  Gerald F. O'Leary Jr., President;  Thomas I. Atkins;  John E. Kerrigan;  Garret M. Byrne;  Frederick C. Langone;  John L. Saltonstall Jr.;  William J. Foley Jr.;  Patrick F. McDonough; Joseph F. Timilty.
 Following Edward F. McLaughlin Jr.'s election as Lieutenant Governor of Massachusetts, he was replaced on the City Council by Thomas A. Sullivan in January 1961.
 In 1961, White resigned from the City Council due to ill health. He was succeeded by Frederick C. Langone on May 1, 1961.

1970–1979 
 1970:  Gabriel F. Piemonte, President;  Thomas I. Atkins;  John E. Kerrigan; Louise Day Hicks;  Frederick C. Langone;  John L. Saltonstall Jr.;  Christopher A. Iannella;  Gerald F. O'Leary Jr.;  Joseph F. Timilty.
 1971: Gabriel F. Piemonte, President;  Thomas I. Atkins;  John E. Kerrigan;  Louise Day Hicks;  Frederick C. Langone;  John L. Saltonstall Jr.;  Christopher A. Iannella;  Gerald F. O'Leary Jr.;  Joseph F. Timilty; Albert Leo "Dapper" O'Neil.
 1972: Gabriel F. Piemonte, President; Lawrence DiCara;  Patrick F. McDonough;  Albert Leo O'Neil; Christopher A. Iannella;  John Joseph Moakley; John E. Kerrigan;   Gerald F. O'Leary Jr.; Joseph M. Tierney.
 1973: Patrick F. McDonough, President;  Lawrence S. DiCara; Albert Leo O'Neil;  Christopher A. Iannella;  Gabriel F. Piemonte;  John E. Kerrigan;  John Joseph Moakley; Joseph M. Tierney;  Gerald F. O'Leary Jr.;  Frederick C. Langone
 1974–1975: Gerald F. O'Leary Jr., President;  James Michael Connolly;  Christopher A. Iannella;  Lawrence S. DiCara;  Frederick C. Langone;  Albert Leo O'Neil;  Louise Day Hicks;  Patrick F. McDonough; Joseph M. Tierney.
 1976:  Louise Day Hicks, President;  James Michael Connolly;  Christopher A. Iannella;  Patrick F. McDonough;  Lawrence S. DiCara;  John J. Kerrigan;  Albert Leo O'Neil; Frederick C. Langone;  Joseph M. Tierney.
 1977:  Joseph M. Tierney, President;  James Michael Connolly;  Christopher A. Iannella; Patrick F. McDonough;  Lawrence S. DiCara;  John J. Kerrigan;  Albert Leo O'Neil;  Louise Day Hicks;  Frederick C. Langone.
 1978:  Lawrence DiCara, President;  James Michael Connolly;  Christopher A. Iannella;  Albert Leo O'Neil; Frederick C. Langone;  Rosemarie E. Sansone; Raymond Flynn;  Patrick F. McDonough; Joseph M. Tierney.
 1979: Joseph M. Tierney, President;  James Michael Connolly;  Albert Leo O'Neil;  Lawrence S. DiCara;  Christopher A. Iannella; Rosemarie E. Sansone;  Raymond L. Flynn;  Frederick C. Langon;  Patrick F. McDonough;  Louise Day Hicks
5. Following Louise Day Hicks's election to the United States House of Representatives, she was replaced on the City Council by Dapper O'Neil in January 1971.
6. Following John Joseph Moakley's election to the United States House of Representatives, he was replaced on the City Council by Frederick C. Langone in January 1973.
7. Following James Michael Connolly's election as Suffolk County register of probate, he was replaced on the City Council by Louise Day Hicks in January 1979.

1980–1989 

 1980: Christopher A. Iannella, President; Lawrence S. DiCara; Frederick C. Langone; Rosemarie E. Sansone; Raymond L. Flynn; Patrick F. McDonough; John W. Sears; Albert Leo "Dapper" O'Neil; Joseph M. Tierney.
 1981: Patrick F. McDonough, President; Lawrence S. DiCara; Frederick C. Langone; Rosemarie E. Sansone; Raymond L. Flynn; John W. Sears; Christopher A. Iannella; Albert Leo O'Neil; Joseph M. Tierney.
 1982: Christopher A. Iannella, President; Bruce C. Bolling; Terence P. McDermott; Raymond L. Flynn; Frederick C. Langone; Albert Leo O'Neil; Maura A. Hennigan; Michael J. McCormack; Joseph M. Tierney.
 1983: Joseph M. Tierney, President; Bruce C. Bolling; Christopher A. Iannella; Terence P. McDermott; Raymond L. Flynn; Frederick C. Langone; Albert Leo O'Neil; Maura A. Hennigan; Michael J. McCormack.

Starting with the November 1983 election (for terms starting in January 1984) the City Council consists of four at-large members and nine district representatives.

1990–1999 

 Following the death of Christopher A. Iannella in September 1992; Albert Leo "Dapper" O'Neil was selected as president, while Bruce Bolling served the remainder of Iannella's term, as Bolling had finished fifth in the general election for four at-large seats.

 Following the resignation of Richard P. Iannella, who had been elected Register of Probate of Suffolk County, Stephen J. Murphy joined the council in February 1997 and served the balance of Iannella's term, as Murphy had finished fifth in the general election for four at-large seats.

2000–2009 

 Francis Roache, Brian Honan, and James M. Kelley did not complete their terms and were replaced by Felix D. Arroyo, Jerry P. McDermott, and Bill Linehan, respectively.

2010–2019 

 Both John M. Tobin Jr. and Chuck Turner did not complete their terms and were replaced by Matt O'Malley and Tito Jackson, respectively, through special elections.

 Following Ayanna Pressley's election to the United States House of Representatives, she was replaced on the City Council by Althea Garrison in January 2019.

2020–2029 

 Following Mayor Marty Walsh's appointment as United States Secretary of Labor, Kim Janey became Active Mayor and Matt O'Malley presided over the City Council.
 
 Following Lydia Edwards' election to the Massachusetts State Senate, Gabriela "Gigi" Coletta won the May 3, 2022 special election to replace Edwards as the District 1 city councilor.

See also
 Boston Board of Selectmen, 1630s–1822
 Boston City Hall, seat of municipal government 1969–present
 Old City Hall (Boston), seat of municipal government 1865–1969
 Suffolk County Courthouse, seat of municipal government ca.1841–1865
 Old State House (Boston, Massachusetts), seat of municipal government ca.1830–1841

References

Further reading

External links
 City Council at boston.gov
 YouTube
 Google news archive

Government of Boston
Government Center, Boston
History of Boston
 
Lists of Massachusetts politicians
City Council
City Council